= W. E. B. Du Bois Boyhood Homesite =

- U.S. National Register of Historic Places
- U.S. National Historic Landmark
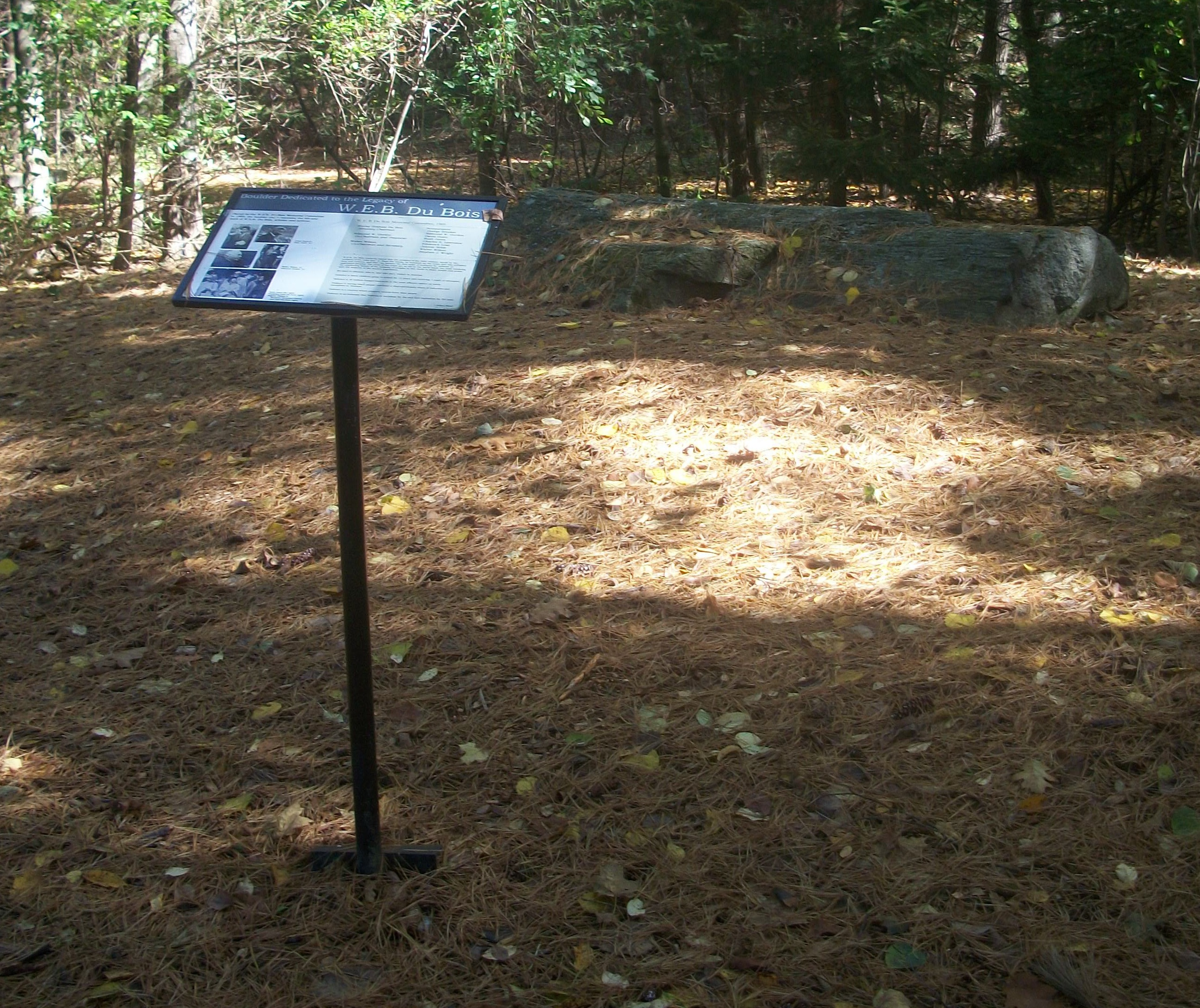
- Memorial boulder, 2010

- Location within Massachusetts Location within the United States
- Location: Great Barrington, Massachusetts
- Coordinates: 42°10′42″N 73°23′37″W
- Area: 5 acres (2.0 ha)
- NRHP reference No.: 76000947
- Added to NRHP: May 11, 1976

The W. E. B. Du Bois Boyhood Homesite (or W. E. B. Du Bois Homesite) is a National Historic Landmark in Great Barrington, Massachusetts, commemorating an important location in the life of African American intellectual and civil rights activist W. E. B. Du Bois (1868–1963). The site contains foundational remnants of the home of Du Bois's grandfather, where Du Bois lived for the first five years of his life. Du Bois was given the house in 1928, and planned to renovate it, but was unable to do so. He sold it in 1954 and the house was torn down later that decade.

The site is located on South Egremont Road (state routes 23 and 41), west of the junction with State Route 71. Plans to develop the site as a memorial to Du Bois in the late 1960s were delayed due to local opposition. The site's proponents attributed this in part to racism, but opposition opinions were generally expressed in terms of rejecting Du Bois's more radical politics in later life. He left the US for Ghana in 1961 and did not return. On May 11, 1976, the site was declared a National Historic Landmark and listed on the National Register of Historic Places. The site was donated to the state in 1987, and is administered by the University of Massachusetts Amherst.

== History ==
The Burghardt family (of Dutch origin) was present in the vicinity of Great Barrington, Massachusetts in colonial times, with documented ownership of land in the area from the 1740s. Tom Burghardt was an African American slave of the family and had Dutch, English, African and Native American ancestry. He likely earned his freedom by participating in the American Revolutionary War. Among his descendants was Mary Silvinia Burghardt, the mother of W. E. B. Du Bois, born in 1868. He became a leading African American intellectual, civil rights activist, and co-founder in 1909 of the National Association for the Advancement of Colored People (NAACP).

By the early 19th century, the "Black Burghardts" had settled in the Egremont Plain area a few miles outside the center of Great Barrington. After being abandoned by Du Bois's father, his mother moved with her infant son to the house of her parents, Othello Burghardt and his wife. In his 1928 article, "The House of the Black Burghardts", Du Bois described the house as "a delectable place — simple, square and low, with the great room of the fireplace, the flagged kitchen, half a step below, and the lower woodshed beyond. Steep strong stairs led to Sleep, while without was a brook, a well and a mighty elm."

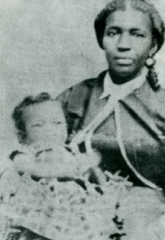
W. E. B. Du Bois and mother

When Du Bois was five years old, his grandfather died, and his widowed grandmother was forced to sell their house to settle debts. Du Bois's mother moved the family into Great Barrington, where she struggled to support her son. A gifted student, Du Bois attended Fisk University on scholarship and with funds raised by members of his First Congregational Church in town. He completed a second bachelor's degree at Harvard, as well as graduate work there and in Berlin, becoming the first African American to earn a doctorate at Harvard. He embarked on a distinguished career.

Du Bois's birthplace was torn down around 1900. Over the next decades, Du Bois periodically returned to Great Barrington. His two children were born there (in the homes of maternal relatives). His son Burghardt (1897–1899) died as an infant, and he was buried in the local Mahaimea Cemetery. Du Bois also had his wife Nina (d. 1950) buried there. In 1906, after the Atlanta Race Riot, Du Bois sent his family (including his daughter Yolande, born 1890) to Great Barrington from where he was working at Atlanta University.

Du Bois expressed interest in purchasing his grandfather's property on a visit to Great Barrington in 1925. Three years later the brothers Joel and Arthur Spingarn, both civil rights activists involved in the NAACP, raised funds and purchased the old Burghardt homestead as a gift to Du Bois for his sixtieth birthday. Du Bois had plans to develop the property as a middle-class summer retreat. But his financial difficulties and move in 1934 from New York City to Atlanta made it too difficult to accomplish that. Du Bois finally sold the property to a neighbor in 1954, who had the house (by then dilapidated) torn down.

== Conversion to memorial ==
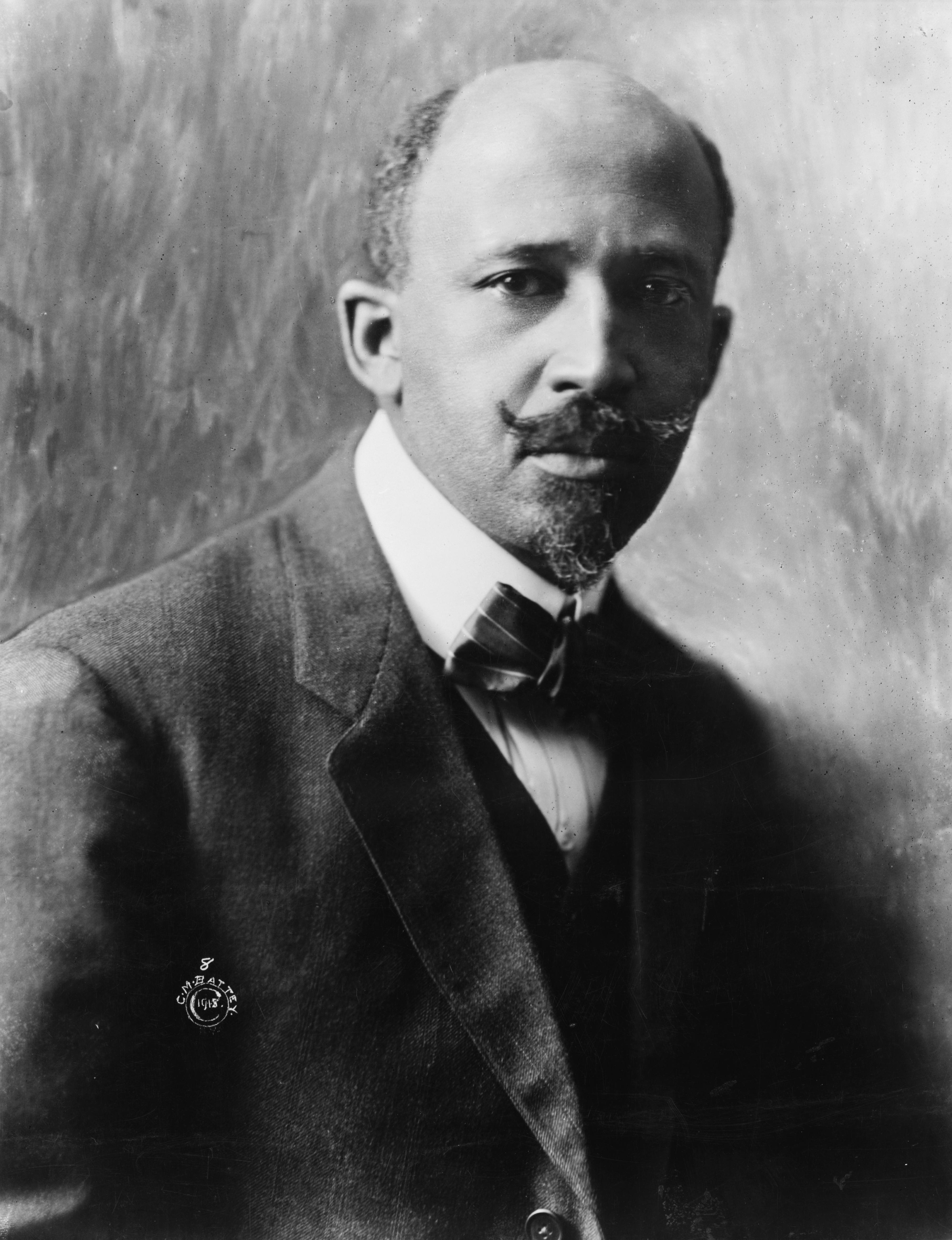
W. E. B. Du Bois, 1918

In 1967 Walter Wilson and Edmund Gordon purchased two parcels of the old Burghardt lands, including the site of the former Burghardt house, that form a U shape around a private residence. They announced their intention to develop the property as a park to commemorate Du Bois, who died in Ghana in 1963. This plan met with local opposition. Wilson and Gordon were both outsiders: Wilson was a controversial area real estate developer originally from Tennessee, and Gordon was from New York City.

Opposition was generally couched as criticism of Du Bois for his Communist sympathies and his alleged renunciation of American citizenship for that of Ghana late in life. (He never renounced his US citizenship, but did accept it in Ghana.) He died and was buried there. This was a period in the United States of growing controversy related to the Vietnam War and tumultuous social changes, and Du Bois's position was resented by veterans' organizations such as the Veterans of Foreign Wars.

Wilson worked to explain Du Bois's complex legacy and support for civil rights. He noted that Benedict Arnold was memorialized at Saratoga for his role in the 1777 Battles of Saratoga despite his later treason during the Revolution. Some supporters of the memorial suspected the FBI was behind the opposition (Du Bois having been under its scrutiny because of his communist views). The FBI was found to have considered planting a critical news story, but it concluded that local opposition was sufficient and did not intervene. Wilson felt that many opponents were motivated by racial issues, but no opposition was expressed in racial terms. After the achievements of the Civil Rights Movement in gaining national legislation, including the Voting Rights Act of 1965, the movement was changing. Some people felt threatened by the rise of the Black Power movement and racial riots in several cities in the summer of 1967.

Wilson and Gordon established the Du Bois Memorial Foundation to take ownership of the property. Funded in part by high-profile donors including Ruby Dee, Ossie Davis, Sidney Poitier, and Norman Rockwell, the foundation received the property in September 1969 and dedicated it to Du Bois later that year. Local hostility continued; the Berkshire Courier, while counseling against violence, suggested the site be vandalized. The town briefly threatened to prevent the dedication ceremony, suggesting there was a question as to whether the intended use of the site met local zoning regulations.

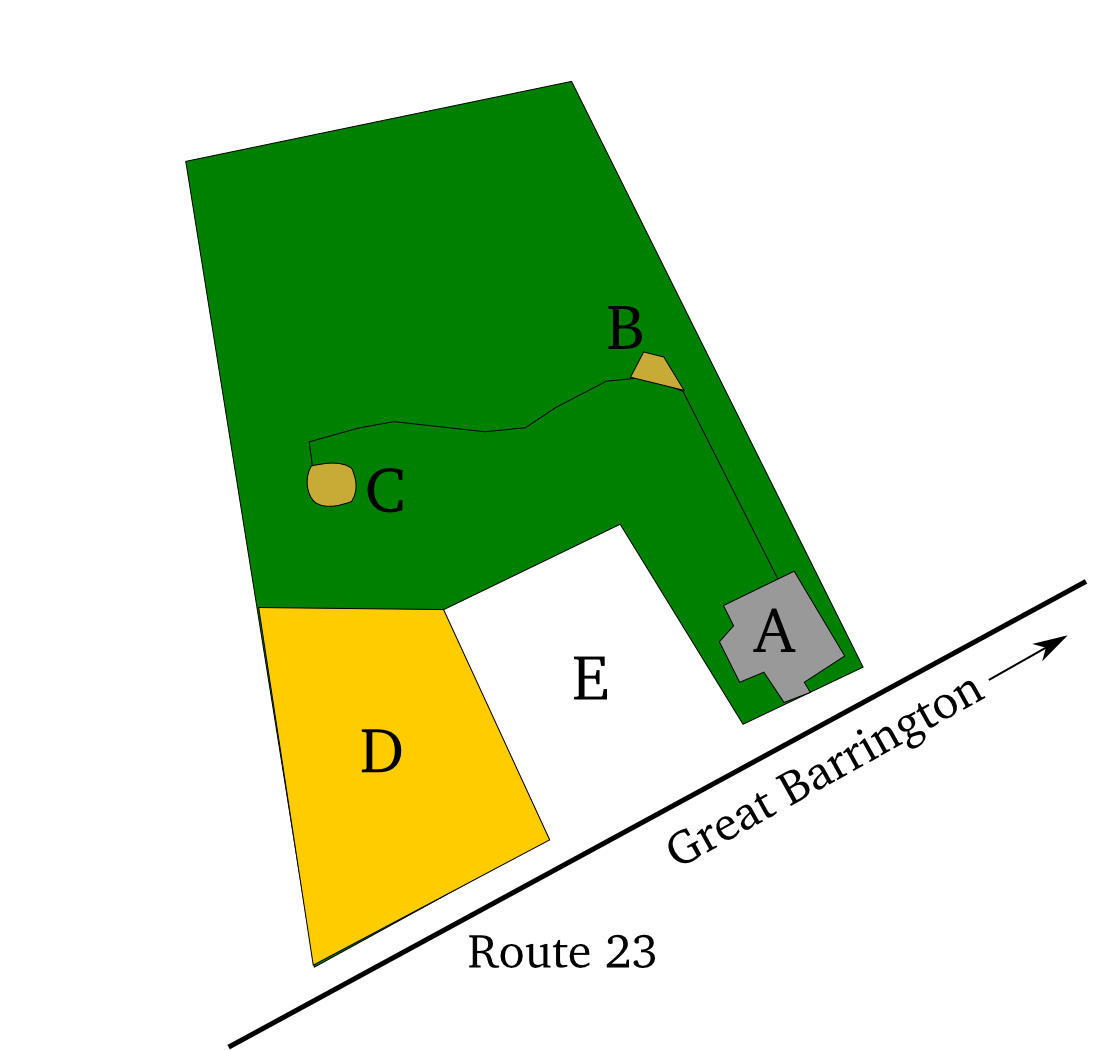
Map of the site as of 2009. The green area is mostly wooded, the yellow area is more open. Legend: *A: Parking lot; *B: Interpretive display; *C: Commemorative boulder; *D: Home site area; *E: Private property

Over the next ten years, the Foundation did not develop the property in any significant way. Its members were reluctant to place permanent markers and displays on it for fear of vandalism or theft. In 1976, a decade after Du Bois's death, the site was designated as a National Historic Landmark, and listed on the National Register of Historic Places.

In 1983 the University of Massachusetts, Amherst, with the permission of the Foundation, began a series of archaeological excavations on the property, seeking to research the history of the "Black Burghardt" family. It already had amassed a collection of Du Bois papers, which were transferred to it by Herbert Aptheker, whom Du Bois designated as his literary executor. In 1987 the Foundation turned the property over to the state, with the university as its steward. The university paid for construction of a parking area and the installation of interpretive signs.

== Today ==
Since the late 20th century, the two parcels of land that form the 5-acre (2.0 ha) site have been planted with a thick grove of pine trees. A path leads north from the parking area to an informational kiosk about Du Bois and his life. From there another path leads west, into a small depression where a memorial boulder was installed with a commemorative plaque. Near the southwest corner of the property are the remnants of the original house's stone foundation. Although Great Barrington residents have come to support the Du Bois legacy and have marked other places in town important in his life, the site has occasionally been a target of vandalism. The site is considered part of the Upper Housatonic Valley National Heritage Area.

If one slips out the northern neck of Manhattan and flies to the left of the silver Sound, one swoops in time onto the Golden River; and dodging its shining beauty, now right, now left, comes after a hundred miles of lake, hill and mountain, in the Old Bay State. Then at the foot of high Mt. Everett one takes a solemn decision; left is sweet, old Sheffield; but pass it by stolidly and slip gently into tiny South Egremont which always sleeps. Then wheel right again and come to Egremont Plain and the House of the Black Burghardts.

— W. E. B. Du Bois

== See also ==
- List of National Historic Landmarks in Massachusetts
- National Register of Historic Places listings in Berkshire County, Massachusetts
- List of African-American historic places
- W. E. B. Du Bois House, Baltimore, Maryland, a Baltimore City Landmark
