= State Route 71 (New York–Massachusetts) =

Highway in Massachusetts and New York

Route 71
- Map of Berkshire County, Massachusetts and Columbia County, New York with Route 71 highlighted in red

Route information
- Maintained by MassDOT and NYSDOT
- Length: 7.93 mi (12.76 km) MA 71: 5.6291 mi; NY 71: 2.30 mi
- History: MA 71 assigned c. 1939; NY 71 assigned 1930

Major junctions
- West end: NY 22 in Hillsdale, NY
- East end: Route 23 / Route 41 in Great Barrington, MA

Location
- Country: United States
- State: Massachusetts
- Counties: Columbia (NY), Berkshire (MA)

Highway system
- Massachusetts State Highway System; Interstate; US; State
- New York Highways; Interstate; US; State; Reference; Parkways
← Route 70	Mass.	→ Route 75
← NY 70	New York	→ NY 72
← Route 68		→ Route 70

Massachusetts Route 71 and New York State Route 71 (NY 71) are adjoining state highways in the states of Massachusetts and New York in the United States. The two highways form a continuous roadway connecting NY 22 in Hillsdale, Columbia County, New York, to Route 23 and Route 41 in Great Barrington, Berkshire County, Massachusetts. Combined, Route 71 and NY 71 extend for 7.93 miles (12.76 km) as a two-lane road through mostly rural areas in the Taconic Mountains, serving only small, unincorporated communities in both states. Both routes are part of the Henry Knox Trail.

The New York half of the highway was rebuilt by the state in the late 1920s and designated as NY 71 as part of the 1930 renumbering of state highways in New York. Its Massachusetts continuation was unnumbered until the early 1930s when it was assigned Route 69. Around the end of the decade, Route 69 was renumbered to Route 71 to match the New York number. At 2.30 miles (3.70 km) in length, NY 71 is the shortest two-digit state highway in New York.

== Route description ==
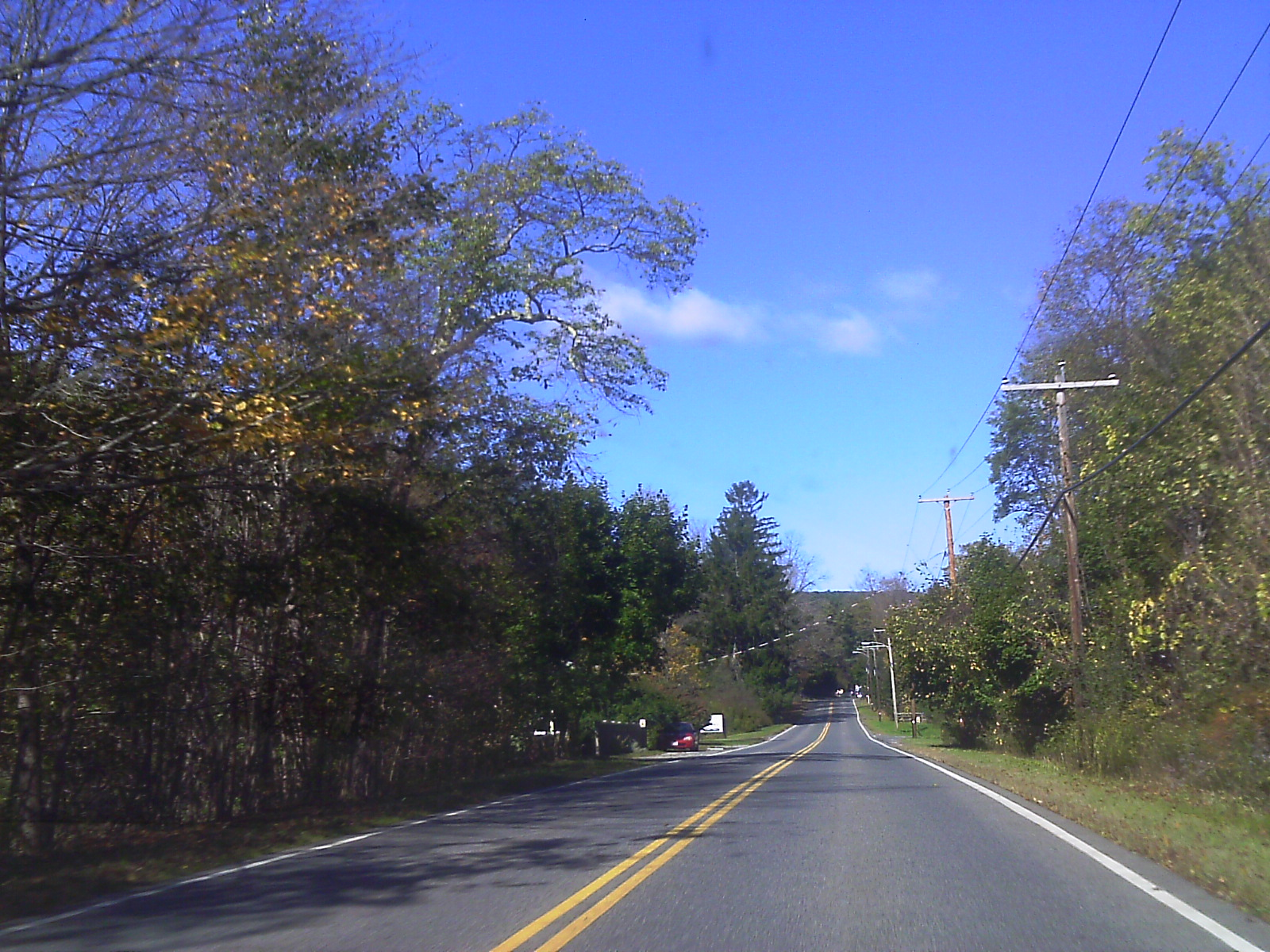
Route 71 in Massachusetts, heading westbound through Alford

The two-state highway begins as NY 71 at a Y intersection with NY 22 in Green River, a hamlet within the town of Hillsdale in Columbia County, New York. Both legs of the junction are two-lane, two-way roads; however, only the southern leg is officially designated as part of NY 71. The north leg is also state-maintained but designated as NY 980E, an unsigned reference route. NY 71 heads southeastward from the Y intersection as a two-lane road named Nobletown Road, following the Green River through a narrow valley in the Taconic Mountains. It passes several homes in an otherwise wooded area on its way to the Massachusetts state line, from which the roadway continues as that state's Route 71. Now in the town of Alford in Berkshire County, Massachusetts, Route 71 changes names to Green River Valley Road, continuing through residential areas in the base of the river valley. The valley and the road curve slightly southward near the Egremont town line, at which point the level of development along the highway begins to slowly taper off.

Across the town line, Route 71 changes names to Egremont Plain Road. It continues alongside the Green River to North Egremont, an unincorporated village comprising a small cluster of homes around Route 71's junction with Boice and Prospect Lake roads. In the center of the community, the highway passes along the east side of the National Register of Historic Places-listed North Egremont Historic District. Outside of the village, Route 71 bends back to the southeast, proceeding through another rural stretch to reach the residential village of Egremont Plain. Near the center of the community, the highway crosses into the town of Great Barrington and passes south of Walter J. Koladza Airport. Route 71 continues to serve mostly residential areas until it ends at a junction with Route 23 and Route 41 (Egremont Road) about 1 mile (1.6 km) east of the town line and 2 miles (3.2 km) southwest of the town center.

== History ==
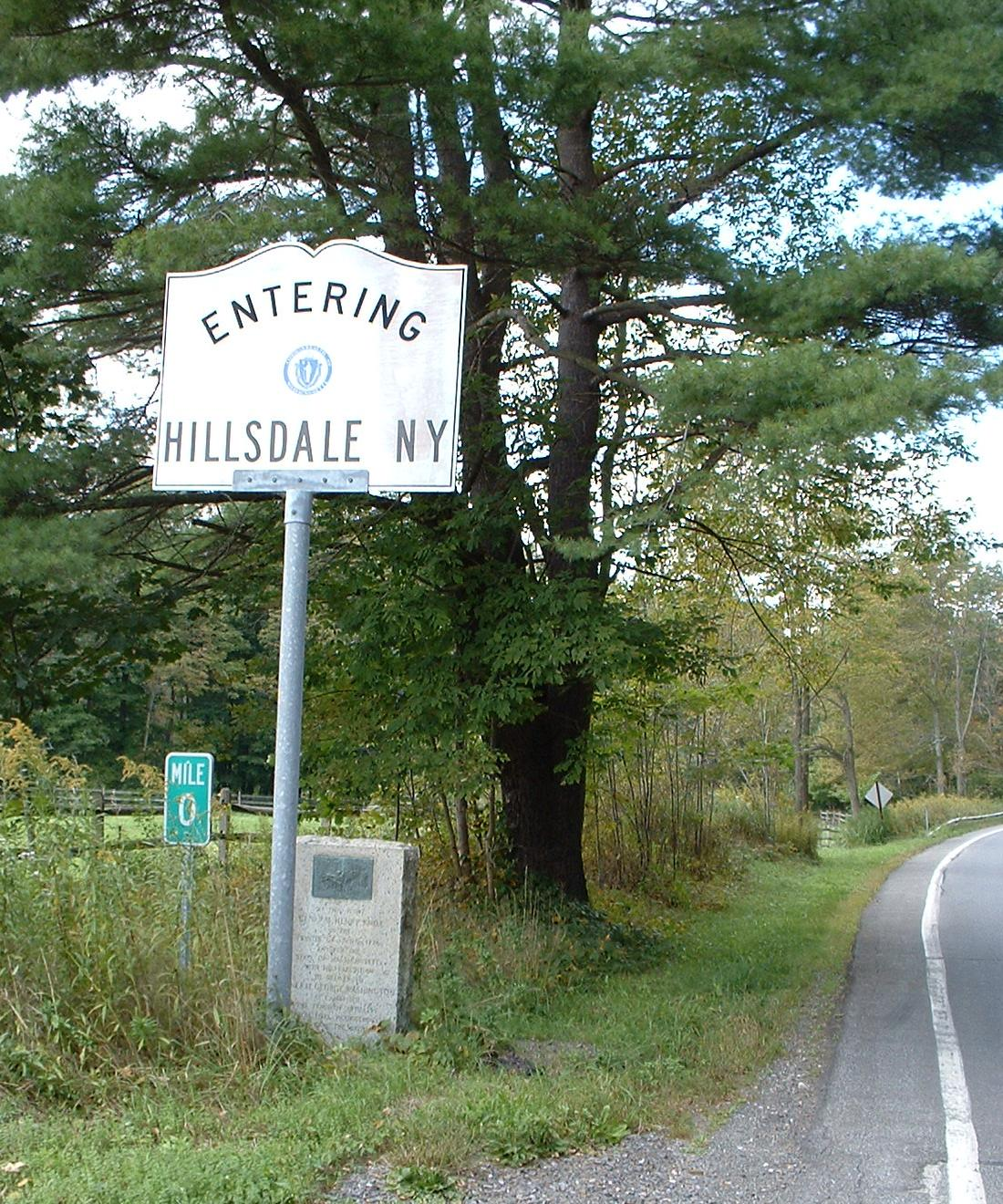
Route 71 westbound entering Hillsdale, New York. A marker for the Henry Knox Trail is located at the base of the town line sign.

In mid-1928, the state of New York awarded a contract worth $139,262 (equivalent to $2.53 million in 2024) to improve the New York portion of the Green River–Great Barrington highway to state highway standards. Work on the highway was completed by the following year. At the state line, the road connected to an unimproved road leading southeast through North Egremont to Great Barrington. The state of Massachusetts had planned to reconstruct the road after work on its continuation into New York was completed; however, the New York state line–Great Barrington highway remained unimproved through the end of the decade. In the 1930 renumbering of state highways in New York, the section of the Green River–Great Barrington highway in New York was designated as NY 71. Its Massachusetts continuation became Route 69 c. 1932; it was subsequently renumbered in 1939 to Route 71 to match the New York designation.

== Major intersections ==
State	County	Location	mi	km	Destinations	Notes
New York	Columbia	Hillsdale	0.00	0.00	NY 22 – Hillsdale, Austerlitz	Western terminus of NY 71; hamlet of Green River
New York	Columbia	Hillsdale	0.18	0.29	To NY 22 north – Austerlitz	Access via NY 980E; hamlet of Green River
New York–Massachusetts state line			2.30 0.00	3.70 0.00	Route transition	
Massachusetts	Berkshire	Egremont	3.94	6.34	To Route 41 south (Route 23 west) – South Egremont	Access via Creamery Road
Massachusetts	Berkshire	Great Barrington	5.63	9.06	Route 23 / Route 41 – Great Barrington	Eastern terminus of Route 71
1.000 mi = 1.609 km; 1.000 km = 0.621 mi: Route transition
