= North Egremont Historic District =

Historic district in Massachusetts, United States

- U.S. National Register of Historic Places
- U.S. Historic district
- Old Egremont Country Store

- Location within Massachusetts Location within the United States
- Location: MA 71 at Pleasant Lake Rd., Egremont, Massachusetts
- Coordinates: 42°11′55″N 73°26′25″W
- Area: 234 acres (95 ha)
- Architectural style: Bungalow/Craftsman, Greek Revival, Federal
- NRHP reference No.: 88003126
- Added to NRHP: January 20, 1989

The North Egremont Historic District is a historic district in Egremont, Massachusetts. It encompasses a crossroads village in the northern part of the town, where the north-south road, now Massachusetts Route 71, connects Kinderhook, New York to points further south, and the east-west road runs from Hillsdale, New York, toward Housatonic, Massachusetts. The district encompasses some 236 acres (96 ha) along these and other roadways near their junction. It was listed on the National Register of Historic Places in 1989.

== Description and history ==
Egremont was settled in the mid-18th century, in a basically dispersed rural agricultural pattern. The village of North Egremont began to take shape after a turnpike (now Prospect Lake Road) was built between Hillsdale, New York and Alford, Massachusetts, and another (now Route 71) was built between South Egremont and Kinderhook, New York in 1803. A tavern was built in the area in 1790, and it was served by saw and grist mills on nearby Prospect Lake. A general store opened in 1814; it is still in operation as the Old Egremont Country Store.

The oldest property in the area, a house, has elements dating to 1764, and the district includes three historic church buildings, the oldest being a significantly altered Baptist meetinghouse from 1816. The later churches are an 1887 Baptist church, built as a replacement for the first one, and a Methodist church built in the Renaissance Revival style in 1861. The only other notable institutional building is the wood frame clapboarded North Egremont School, built in 1880.

== See also ==
- National Register of Historic Places listings in Berkshire County, Massachusetts
