= Upper Housatonic Valley National Heritage Area =

United States National Heritage Area in Connecticut and Massachusetts

Coordinates: 42°15′N 73°18′W

The Upper Housatonic Valley National Heritage Area is a federally designated National Heritage Area in the U.S. states of Connecticut and Massachusetts. The heritage area interprets and promotes the historical, cultural and scenic features of the upper Housatonic River valley in the western part of both states. The heritage area focuses on five themes: the area's role as a resort for writers, artists, actors and musicians, the scenic landscape, the area's role in industry, the American Revolutionary War, and the social and religious groups associated with the area.

The National Heritage Area comprises the towns of Colebrook, Norfolk, North Canaan, Canaan, Salisbury, Sharon, Cornwall, Warren and Kent in Connecticut, and New Marlborough, Sheffield, Mount Washington, Egremont, Alford, Great Barrington, Monterey, Tyringham, Becket, Washington, Lee, Stockbridge, West Stockbridge, Richmond, Lenox, Hancock, Pittsfield, Lanesborough, Dalton and Hinsdale in Massachusetts.
