= Great Barrington =

Great Barrington may refer to:

== Places ==
- Great Barrington, Gloucestershire, a village in England
- Great Barrington, Massachusetts, a town in the United States
  - Great Barrington (CDP), Massachusetts, the main village in the town

== Document ==
- Great Barrington Declaration, a 2020 open letter generally opposing COVID-19 lockdowns and restrictions
