= WBCR-LP =

- Great Barrington, Massachusetts; United States
- Broadcast area: Great Barrington, Massachusetts
- Frequency: 97.7 MHz

Programming
- Format: Community radio
- Affiliations: Pacifica Radio Network

Ownership
- Owner: Berkshire Community Radio Alliance

History
- First air date: October 23, 2004
- Call sign meaning: Berkshire Community Radio

Technical information
- Licensing authority: FCC
- Facility ID: 135676
- Class: L1
- ERP: 100 watts
- HAAT: −179.6 meters (−589 ft)
- Transmitter coordinates: 42°11′31.3″N 73°22′19.4″W

Links
- Public license information: LMS
- Website: www.berkshireradio.org

WBCR-LP is a low power FM radio station with office and studio located in Great Barrington, Massachusetts, broadcasting on the 97.7 FM frequency. The organization's legal name is "Berkshire Community Radio Alliance", and is also known as "Berkshire Community Radio" or "BCR".

WBCR-LP is a 501(c)(3) non-profit, volunteer-run, non-commercial, community radio station with over 70 locally produced shows currently on the air. With a broadcast radius between 8 and 15 miles, depending on terrain, it serves the town of Great Barrington, Massachusetts. WBCR-LP also streams live on the internet.

== History ==
WBCR-LP commenced broadcasting on October 23, 2004.

== Full power upgrade ==
On March 31, 2010, the Federal Communications Commission (FCC) granted the licensee of WBCR-LP, Berkshire Community Radio Alliance, a construction permit for 89.5 MHz from the American Tower communications tower in Hillsdale, New York. When built, the station would have run 550 watts vertical from 144 meters above average terrain. However, in March 2013 the board of directors voted to remain as a low power station and turned the construction permit over to New England Public Radio, which put the 89.5 facility on the air as WNNU.

== See also ==
- List of community radio stations in the United States
