= Ski Butternut =

Ski area in Great Barrington, Massachusetts

- Interactive map of Ski Butternut
- Location: Great Barrington, Massachusetts, US
- Coordinates: 42°10′41″N 73°19′01″W
- Vertical: 1,000 ft (300 m)
- Top elevation: 1,800 ft (550 m)
- Base elevation: 820 ft (250 m)
- Trails: 22
- Longest run: Pied Piper, to Crosstown, and then to cruiser.
- Lift system: 5 Chair lift, additional 4 carpet lifts.
- Terrain parks: 2
- Snowfall: 115 in (292 cm)
- Snowmaking: 100%
- Website: Ski Butternut

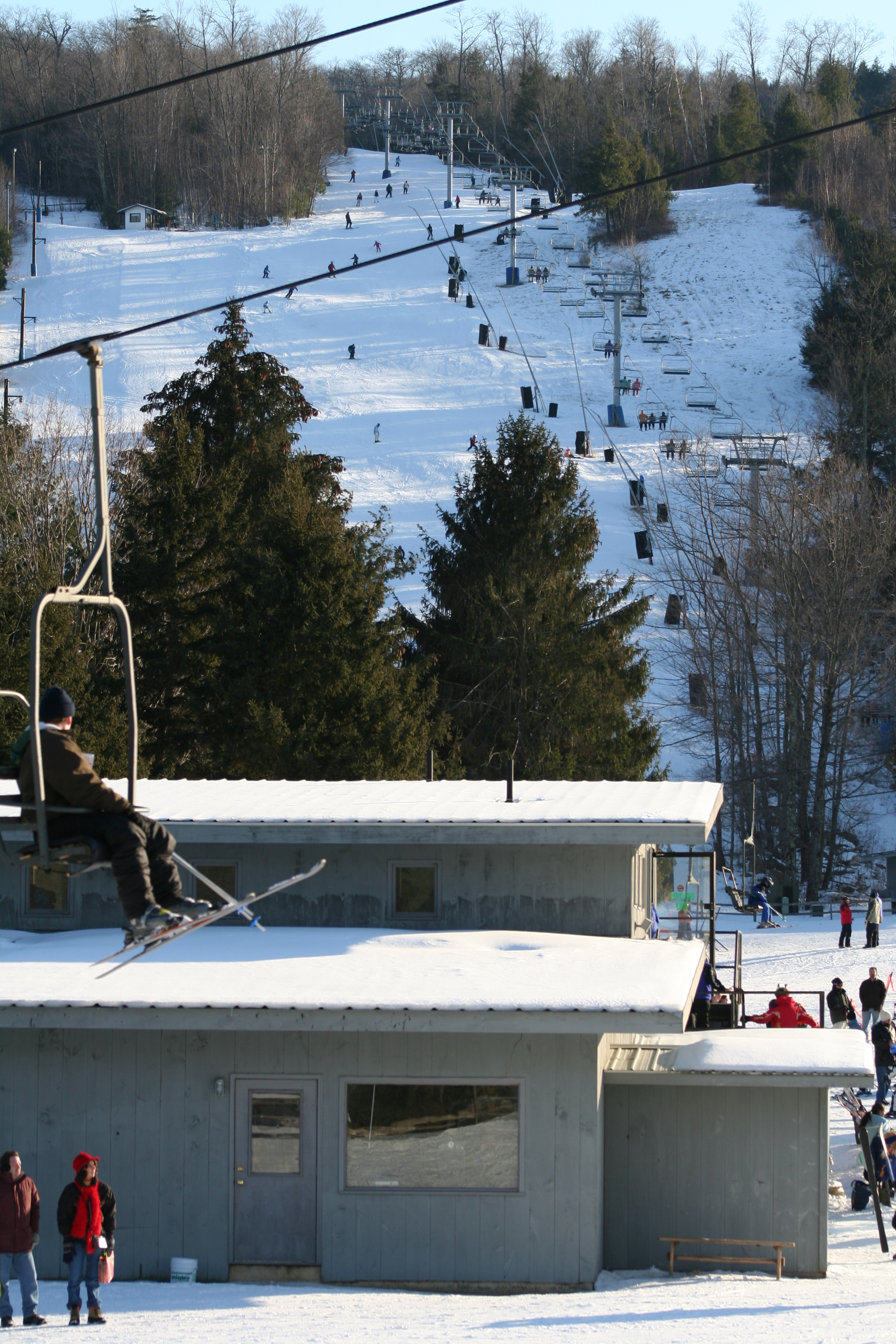

Ski Butternut, also known as Butternut Basin, is a ski resort in Great Barrington, Massachusetts, US, on Warner Mountain in The Berkshires.

Channing and Jane Murdock took control of the area in 1963, naming the area Butternut Basin after the large groves of butternut trees in the basin of the mountain. The Kennedys, family friends of the Murdocks, visited Butternut. The Murdocks' son Jeffrey took over the resort in 1994.

The mountain has 22 trails, ten ski lifts including five quad lifts, two terrain parks, an area for tubing in winter, and a PSIA-affiliated ski school. In the off-season, the mountain hosts a number of summer concerts and festivals, including the annual Berkshires Arts Festival.

== Lifts ==
=== Main Lifts ===
Name	Type	Make	Built
Top Flight	Quad	Garventa-CTEC	1993
Highline	Quad	Garventa-CTEC	1994
Cruiser	Quad	Garventa-CTEC	2005
Jane's	Quad	Skytrac	2026
Paddy's	Quad	CARLEVARO-SAVIO	1969

== 1995 Tornado ==
During the 1995 Great Barrington Tornado, Ski Butternut sustained extensive damages to ski lifts and trails. The tornado caused a total of $2 million in damages, affecting 18 trails, and 5 lifts.
