= Great Barrington (CDP), Massachusetts =

Great Barrington, Massachusetts
- Census-designated place
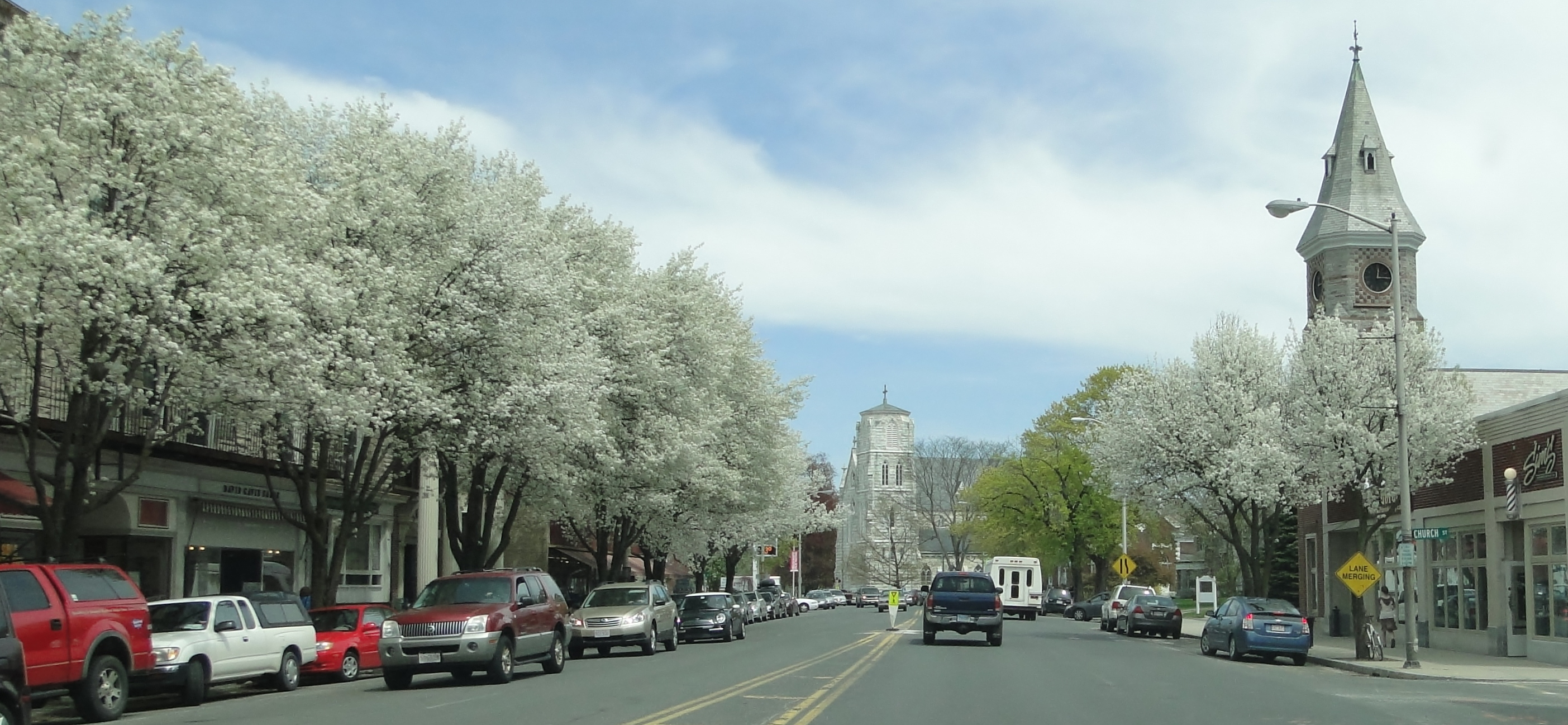
- Main Street

- Location in Berkshire County and the state of Massachusetts.
- Coordinates: 42°11′43″N 73°21′46″W
- Country: United States
- State: Massachusetts
- County: Berkshire
- Town: Great Barrington

Area
  - Total: 1.49 sq mi (3.85 km^{2})
  - Land: 1.44 sq mi (3.73 km^{2})
  - Water: 0.046 sq mi (0.12 km^{2})
- Elevation: 705 ft (215 m)

Population (2020)
  - Total: 2,234
  - Density: 1,550.2/sq mi (598.52/km^{2})
- Time zone: UTC-5 (Eastern (EST))
  - Summer (DST): UTC-4 (EDT)
- ZIP code: 01230
- Area code: 413
- FIPS code: 25-26780
- GNIS feature ID: 0607441

Great Barrington is a census-designated place (CDP) located in the town of Great Barrington in Berkshire County, Massachusetts, United States. The population was 2,231 at the 2010 census, out of 7,104 in the entire town of Great Barrington.

== Geography ==
The Great Barrington CDP is located near the center of the town of Great Barrington at 42°11′43″N 73°21′45″W (42.19532, -73.362645), along the Housatonic River. U.S. Route 7 (Main Street) passes through the center of the CDP, leading north to Stockbridge, Lenox, and Pittsfield, and south to Sheffield then into Connecticut. Massachusetts Route 23 also passes through CDP on Main Street but leads east to Monterey, Otis, and beyond, and west to Egremont and then into New York. Massachusetts Route 41 also uses Main Street in Great Barrington and leads north to West Stockbridge and southwest through South Egremont towards Connecticut.

According to the United States Census Bureau, the Great Barrington CDP has a total area of 1.4 square miles (3.7 km^{2}), of which 1.4 square miles (3.5 km^{2}) is land and 0.039 square miles (0.1 km^{2}), or 3.30%, is water.

== Demographics ==
Historical population
Census	Pop.	Note	%±
2020	2,234		—
U.S. Decennial Census

As of the census of 2000, there were 2,459 people, 1,184 households, and 590 families residing in the CDP. The population density was 668.6 people/km^{2} (1,732 people/mi^{2}). There were 1,282 housing units at an average density of 348.6 units/km^{2} (903 units/mi^{2}). The racial makeup of the CDP was 92.84% White, 3.09% Black or African American, 0.33% Native American, 1.02% Asian, 0.04% Pacific Islander, 1.26% from other races, and 1.42% from two or more races. Hispanic or Latino of any race were 2.97% of the population.

There were 1,184 households, out of which 24.0% had children under the age of 18 living with them, 34.6% were married couples living together, 11.7% had a female householder with no husband present, and 50.1% were non-families. 42.2% of all households were made up of individuals, and 14.5% had someone living alone who was 65 years of age or older. The average household size was 2.06 and the average family size was 2.84.

In the CDP, the population was spread out, with 21.5% under the age of 18, 8.6% from 18 to 24, 27.7% from 25 to 44, 25.9% from 45 to 64, and 16.3% who were 65 years of age or older. The median age was 40 years. For every 100 females, there were 87.4 males. For every 100 females age 18 and over, there were 84.2 males.

The median income for a household in the CDP was $35,077, and the median income for a family was $53,542. Males had a median income of $31,653 versus $28,846 for females. The per capita income for the CDP was $23,390. About 2.5% of families and 8.9% of the population were below the poverty line, including 3.7% of those under age 18 and 5.9% of those age 65 or over.
