= Walter J. Koladza Airport =

Walter J. Koladza Airport Great Barrington Airport
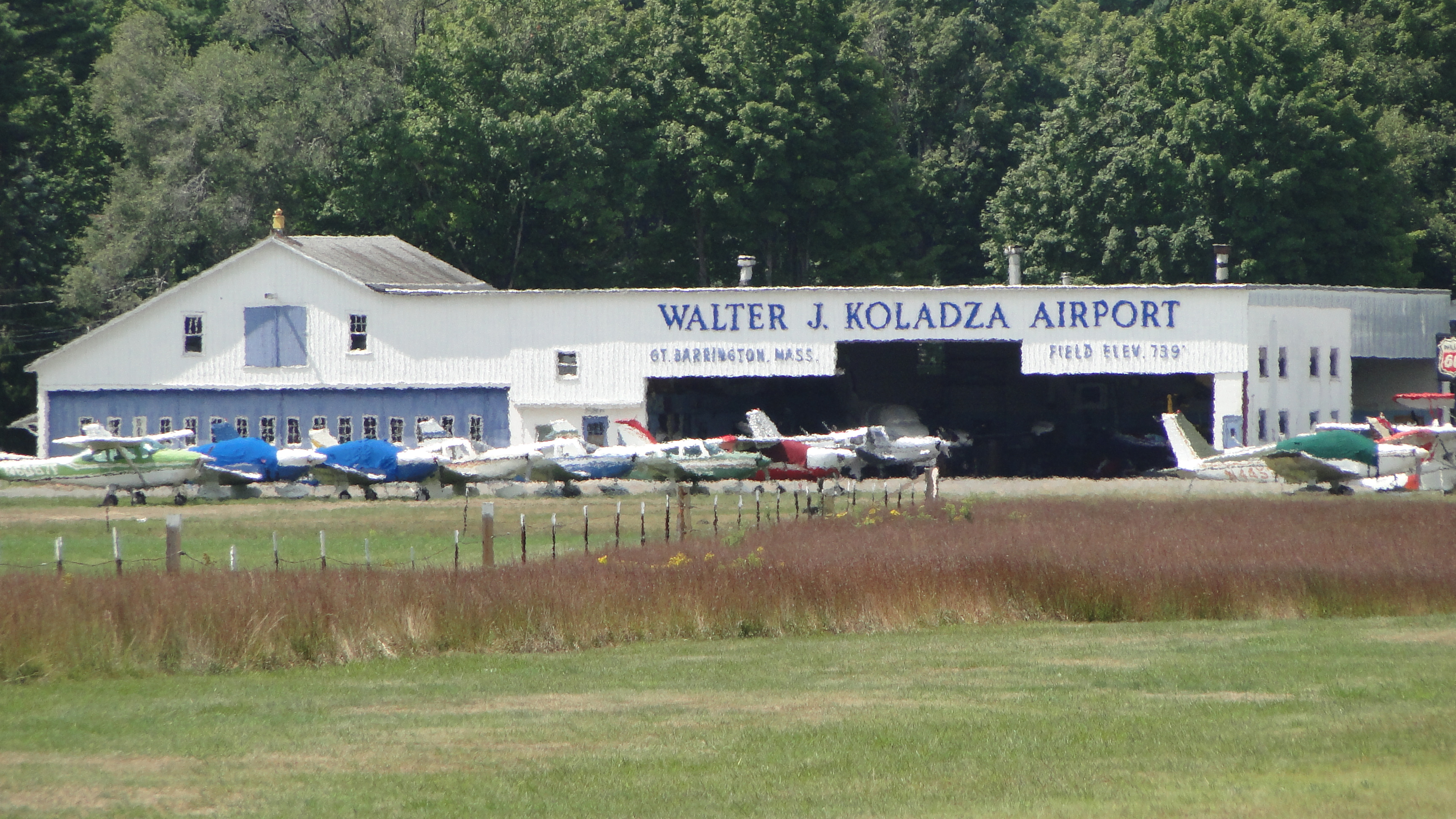
- The main hangar of Walter J. Koladza Airport
- IATA: GBR; ICAO: KGBR

Summary
- Airport type: Private, open to public
- Owner/Operator: Berkshire Aviation Enterprise
- Location: Great Barrington, Massachusetts
- Elevation AMSL: 739 ft / 229.2 m
- Coordinates: 42°11′03.1710″N 73°24′11.67″W
- Website: berkshireaviation.com

Map
- Interactive map of Walter J. Koladza Airport

Runways
Direction	Length		Surface
Direction	ft	m	Surface
11/29	2,579	786	Asphalt

Walter J. Koladza Airport, (IATA: GBR, ICAO: KGBR), also known as the Great Barrington Airport, is a privately owned airport in Great Barrington, Massachusetts open to the public. It has a single 2,579 ft runway. The airport is named after Walter J. Koladza (died September 1, 2004), who was a test pilot during World War II, and the owner of the airport for nearly 60 years.

== See also ==
- List of airports in Massachusetts
