= Alford, Massachusetts =

- Town
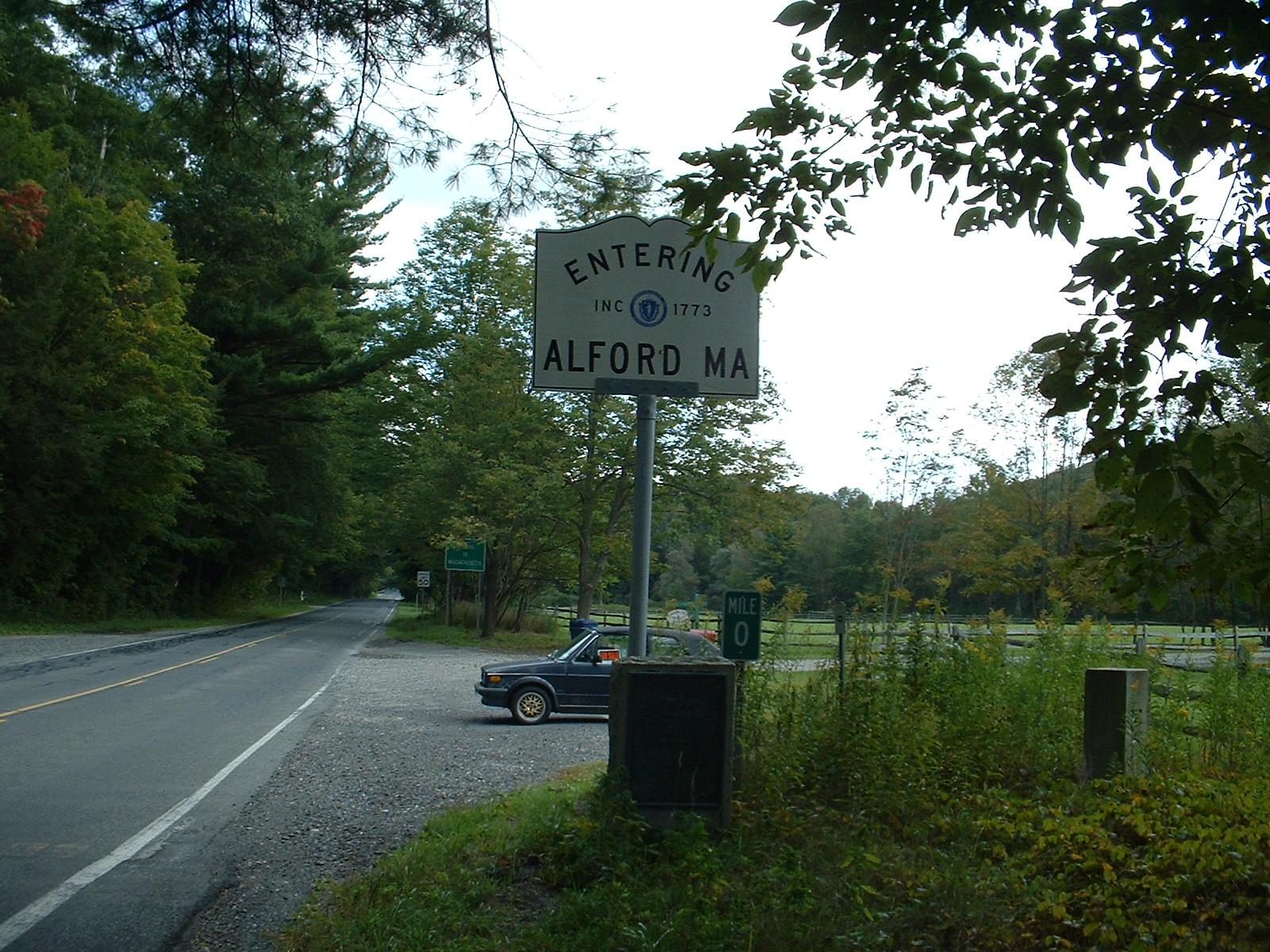
- The state line at Route 71, with a Knox Trail marker beside the road sign

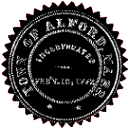
- Seal

- Location in Berkshire County and the state of Massachusetts.
- Coordinates: 42°14′08″N 73°24′50″W
- Country: United States
- State: Massachusetts
- County: Berkshire
- Settled: 1740
- Incorporated: 1773

Government
  - Type: Open town meeting

Area
  - Total: 11.5 sq mi (29.9 km^{2})
  - Land: 11.5 sq mi (29.8 km^{2})
  - Water: 0.039 sq mi (0.1 km^{2})
- Elevation: 840 ft (256 m)

Population (2020)
  - Total: 486
  - Density: 42.2/sq mi (16.3/km^{2})
- Time zone: UTC−5 (Eastern)
  - Summer (DST): UTC−4 (Eastern)
- ZIP Codes: 01230 (Great Barrington); 01266 (West Stockbridge)
- Area code: 413
- FIPS code: 25-00975
- GNIS feature ID: 0618263
- Website: www.townofalford.org

Alford is a town in Berkshire County, Massachusetts, United States. It is part of the Pittsfield, Massachusetts Metropolitan Statistical Area. The population was 486 at the 2020 census.

== History ==
Alford was first settled in 1756 as part of a land purchase from the Shauanum Stockbridge Mahican tribe by a group led by Timothy Woodbridge. The town, originally part of Great Barrington, separated in 1769 and was officially incorporated in 1773. It was named for Colonel John Alford of Charlestown, who was known for preaching Christianity to Native Americans and for sponsoring a theology professorship at Harvard College's Divinity School. The town has been mostly agricultural throughout its existence, however in 1799, large marble deposits were found on the western slopes of Tom Ball Mountain, and for the next 90 or so years it would be an industrious mining town. This would come to an end when the railroad was laid in a neighboring valley, rendering the last operating quarries of Alford unable to compete.

The quarries of Alford supplied the marble for many iconic and famous buildings, including New York City's city hall.

Around New Year's Day, 1776, General Henry Knox passed into Massachusetts through the town, bringing cannons from Fort Ticonderoga eastward to help end the Siege of Boston. Today, this route is known as the Knox Trail, and a marker is located at the state line.

The town was home to a commune ran and funded by Fergie Chambers from 2019 to 2024. It was home to a group known as "Berkshire Communists," a Marxist-Leninist collective, which later dissolved due to legal troubles surrounding a protest held at an Elbit Systems facility in Merrimack, New Hampshire in October 2023. The group was involved in organizing anti-zionist protests in neighboring Great Barrington, Massachusetts, as well as hosting Marxist political education sessions for locals.

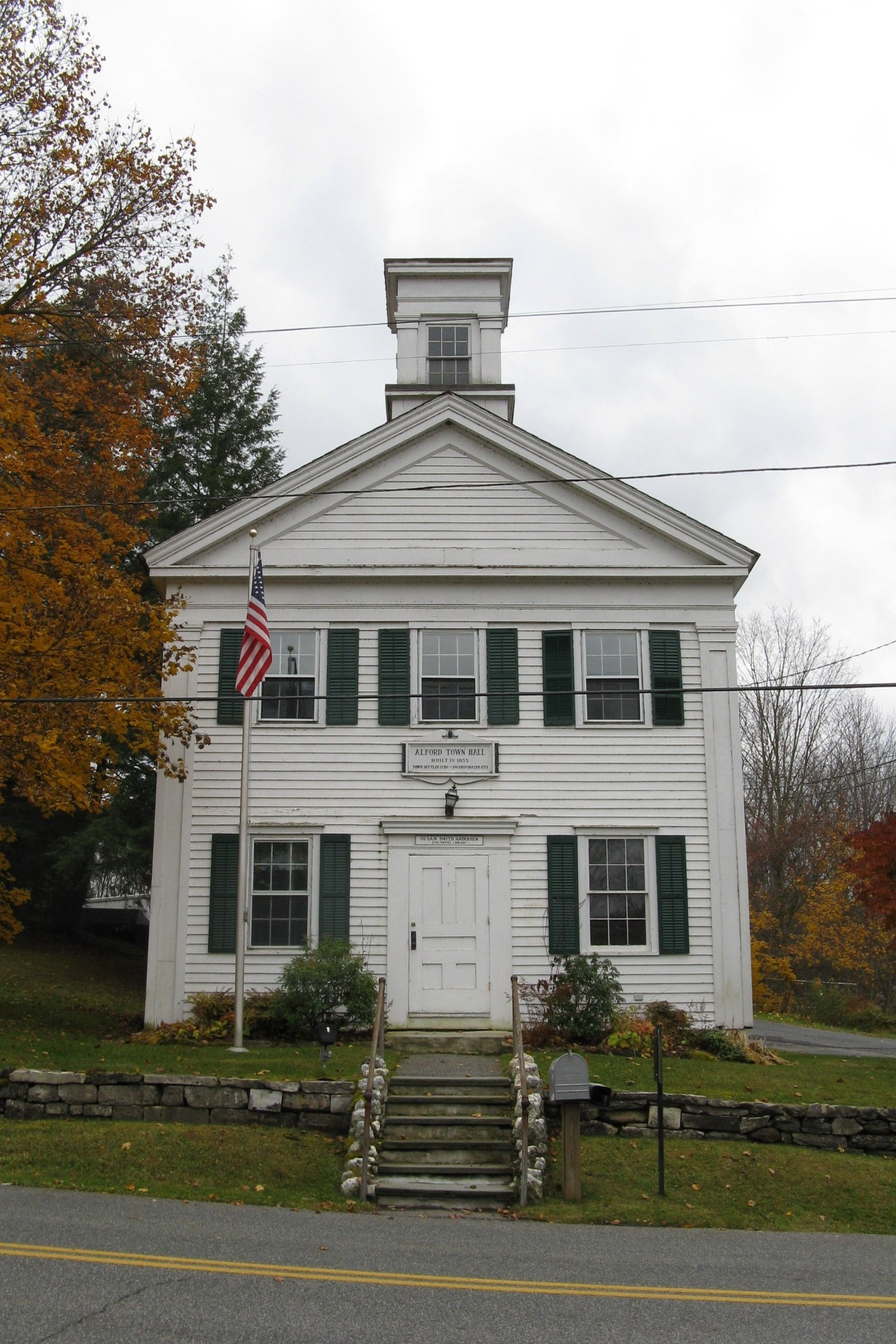
Susan Smith Andersen Library

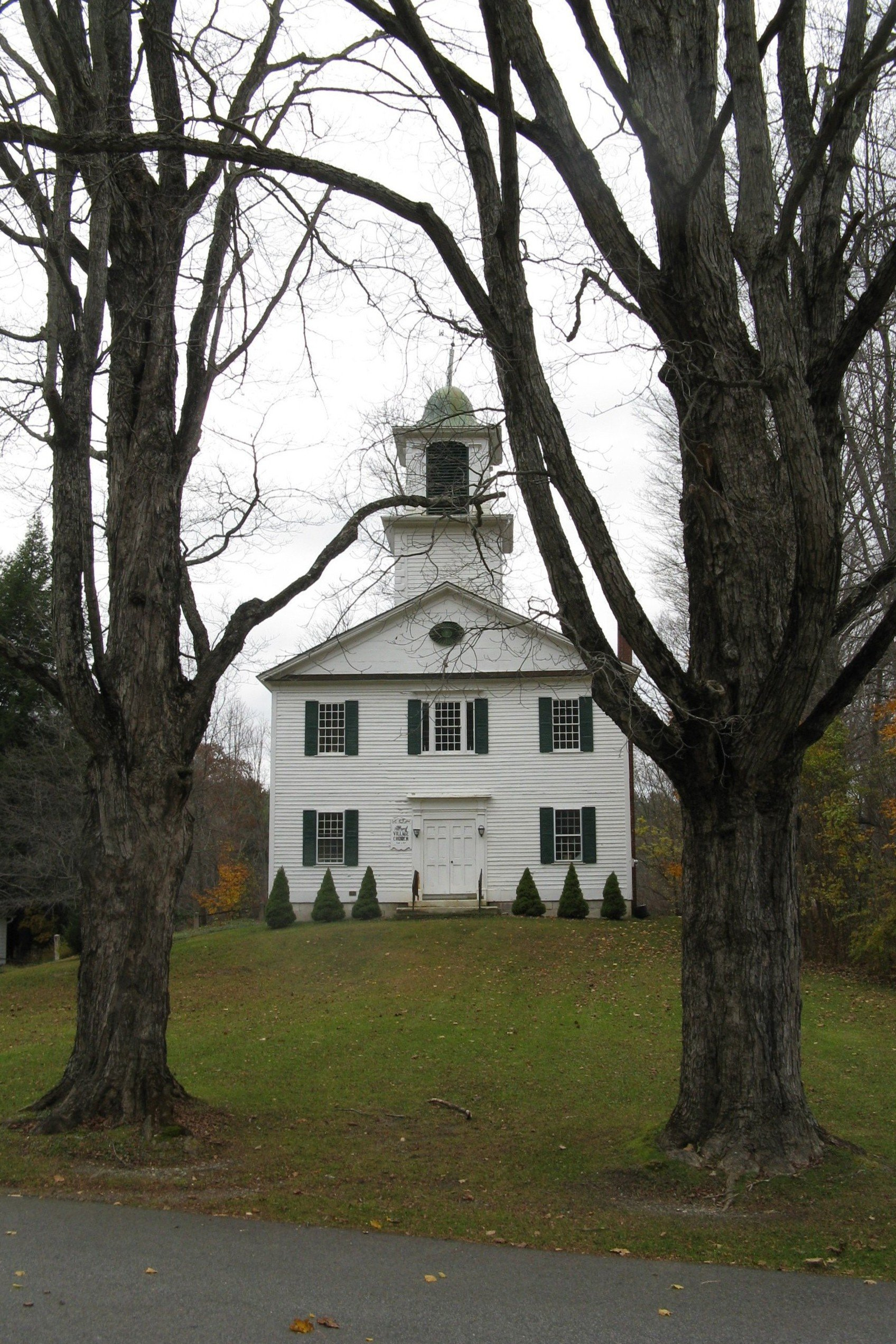
Alford Village Church

== Geography ==
According to the United States Census Bureau, the town has a total area of 11.5 square miles (29.9 km^{2}), of which 11.5 square miles (29.8 km^{2}) is land and 0.04 square miles (0.1 km^{2}), or 0.35%, is water. Alford lies along the western border of Berkshire County and Massachusetts, east of Columbia County, New York. The town, which is roughly shaped like an arrowhead, is bordered by West Stockbridge to the northeast, Great Barrington to the southeast, Egremont to the south, and Hillsdale and Austerlitz, New York, to the west. Alford is located 19 miles (31 km) south-southwest of Pittsfield, 50 miles (80 km) west-northwest of Springfield, 138 miles (222 km) west of Boston, and 44 miles (71 km) southeast of Albany, New York.

Alford is surrounded by hills and mountains of the Taconic Range. The Green River, a tributary of the Housatonic River, flows through the southwest corner of town, and Alford Brook flows through the central part of town, eventually flowing into the Green River in neighboring Great Barrington. Several other brooks flow into these two waterways. To the northeast of town, Tom Ball Mountain peaks just over the town line in West Stockbridge, with its western face being somewhat marshy.

Alford is home to the western terminus of Massachusetts Route 71, a short continuation of New York State Route 71. The Knox Trail follows this route into the state, and the road heads southeastward into Egremont before ending in Great Barrington. There are no other state routes in the town, with few local roads crossing through town. The nearest interstate, Interstate 90 (the Massachusetts Turnpike), passes through neighboring West Stockbridge, with its "turn-around" Exit 1 being 8 miles (13 km) north of Alford. The nearest rail service is at the Amtrak station in Pittsfield, with service to Boston, Chicago and New York City via a connection at Albany. Bus service is available in Pittsfield as well as in Great Barrington, provided by Peter Pan Bus Lines. There are general aviation airports in Great Barrington and Pittsfield, but the nearest airport for commercial flights is Albany International Airport in New York.

== Demographics ==
Historical population
Year	Pop.	±%
1790	577	—
1850	502	−13.0%
1860	542	+8.0%
1870	430	−20.7%
1880	348	−19.1%
1890	297	−14.7%
1900	272	−8.4%
1910	275	+1.1%
1920	248	−9.8%
1930	200	−19.4%
1940	201	+0.5%
1950	212	+5.5%
1960	256	+20.8%
1970	302	+18.0%
1980	394	+30.5%
1990	418	+6.1%
2000	399	−4.5%
2010	494	+23.8%
2020	486	−1.6%
2024*	483	−0.6%
* = population estimate. Source: United States census records and Population Estimates Program data.

As of the census of 2000, there were 399 people, 171 households, and 114 families residing in the town. By population, Alford ranks twenty-ninth out of the 32 cities and towns in Berkshire County, and is ninth-smallest of the 351 cities and towns in Massachusetts. The population density was 34.5 inhabitants per square mile (13.3/km^{2}), which ranks 21st in the county and 326th in the Commonwealth. There were 279 housing units at an average density of 24.1 per square mile (9.3/km^{2}). The racial makeup of the town was 99.00% White, 0.75% African American, and 0.25% from two or more races.

There were 171 households, out of which 22.8% had children under the age of 18 living with them, 59.6% were married couples living together, 4.7% had a female householder with no husband present, and 33.3% were non-families. Of all households 29.8% were made up of individuals, and 10.5% had someone living alone who was 65 years of age or older. The average household size was 2.33 and the average family size was 2.87.

In the town, the population was spread out, with 20.8% under the age of 18, 3.5% from 18 to 24, 18.0% from 25 to 44, 41.6% from 45 to 64, and 16.0% who were 65 years of age or older. The median age was 50 years. For every 100 females, there were 89.1 males. For every 100 females age 18 and over, there were 93.9 males.

The median income for a household in the town was $49,632, and the median income for a family was $62,344. Males had a median income of $47,083 versus $28,929 for females. The per capita income for the town was $40,412. About 2.8% of families and 4.1% of the population were below the poverty line, including 5.2% of those under age 18 and 6.8% of those age 65 or over.

== Government ==
Alford uses the open town meeting form of government, and is led by a board of selectmen. The town has its own police, fire and public works departments, but does not have its own post office (it shares the Egremont, Great Barrington, and West Stockbridge post offices). The town's library is connected to the regional library system. The nearest hospital, Fairview Hospital, is located in neighboring Great Barrington.

On the state level, Alford is represented in the Massachusetts House of Representatives by the Fourth Berkshire district, which covers southern Berkshire County, as well as the westernmost towns in Hampden County. In the Massachusetts Senate, the town is represented by the Berkshire, Hampshire and Franklin district, which includes all of Berkshire County and western Hampshire and Franklin counties. The town is patrolled by the First (Lee) Station of Barracks "B" of the Massachusetts State Police.

On the national level, Alford is represented in the United States House of Representatives as part of Massachusetts's 1st congressional district. Massachusetts is currently represented in the United States Senate by senior Senator Elizabeth Warren and junior Senator Ed Markey.

== Education ==
Alford is part of the Southern Berkshire Regional School District along with Egremont, Monterey, Mount Washington, New Marlborough, and Sheffield. Students in Alford, Egremont and Mount Washington attend the Appalachian School for kindergarten and first grades, with second through sixth grades attending the Undermountain Elementary School in Sheffield, and Mount Everett Regional High School in Sheffield for grades 7–12. There are private schools in Great Barrington and other nearby towns.

The nearest community college is the South County Center of Berkshire Community College in Great Barrington. The nearest state college is Westfield State University, and the nearest University of Massachusetts is the University of Massachusetts Amherst. The nearest private college is Williams College in Williamstown.

== Notable people ==
- Carolyn Gold Heilbrun, mystery writer, once had a summer home in town
- John W. Hulbert (1770–1831), born in Alford, lawyer and congressman from Massachusetts
