= Great Barrington, Massachusetts =

- Town
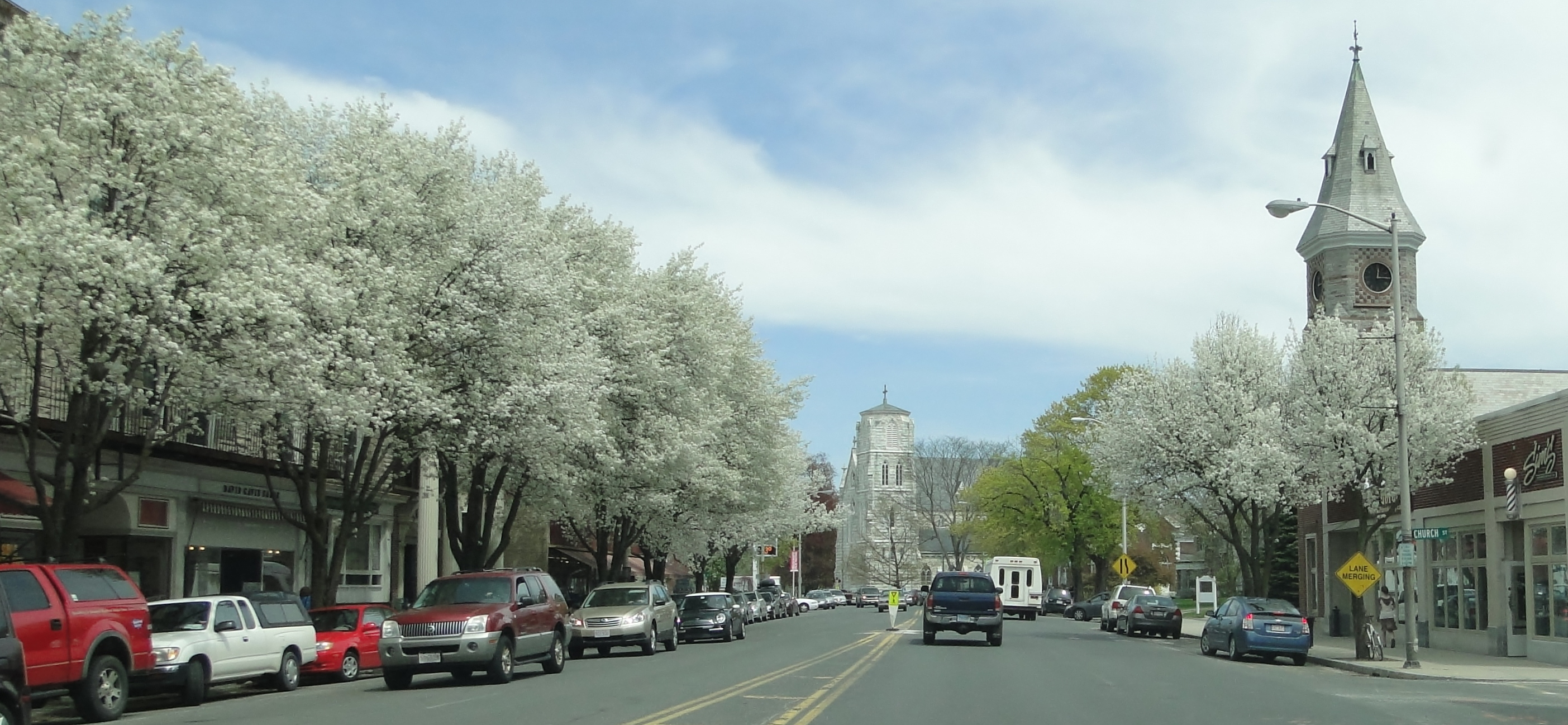
- View from Main Street in the spring

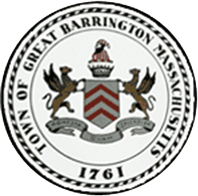
- Coat of arms
- Etymology: Village of Great Barrington in Gloucestershire, England
- Location in Berkshire County and the state of Massachusetts
- Coordinates: 42°11′45″N 73°21′45″W
- Country: United States
- State: Massachusetts
- Region: Western Massachusetts
- County: Berkshire
- Settled: 1726

Area
  - Total: 45.8 sq mi (119 km^{2})
  - Land: 44.8 sq mi (116 km^{2})
  - Water: 1.0 sq mi (2.6 km^{2})

Population (2020)
  - Total: 7,172
  - Density: 160/sq mi (61.8/km^{2})
- Time zone: UTC-5 (Eastern (EST))
  - Summer (DST): UTC-4 (EDT)
- ZIP Codes: 01230 (Great Barrington); 01236 (Housatonic)
- Area code: 413
- FIPS code: 25-26815
- GNIS feature ID: 0619420
- Website: www.townofgbma.gov

Great Barrington is a town in Berkshire County, Massachusetts, United States. It is part of the Pittsfield, Massachusetts, Metropolitan Statistical Area. The population was 7,172 at the 2020 census. Both a summer resort and home to Ski Butternut, a ski resort, Great Barrington includes the villages of Great Barrington, Van Deusenville, and Housatonic.

== History ==
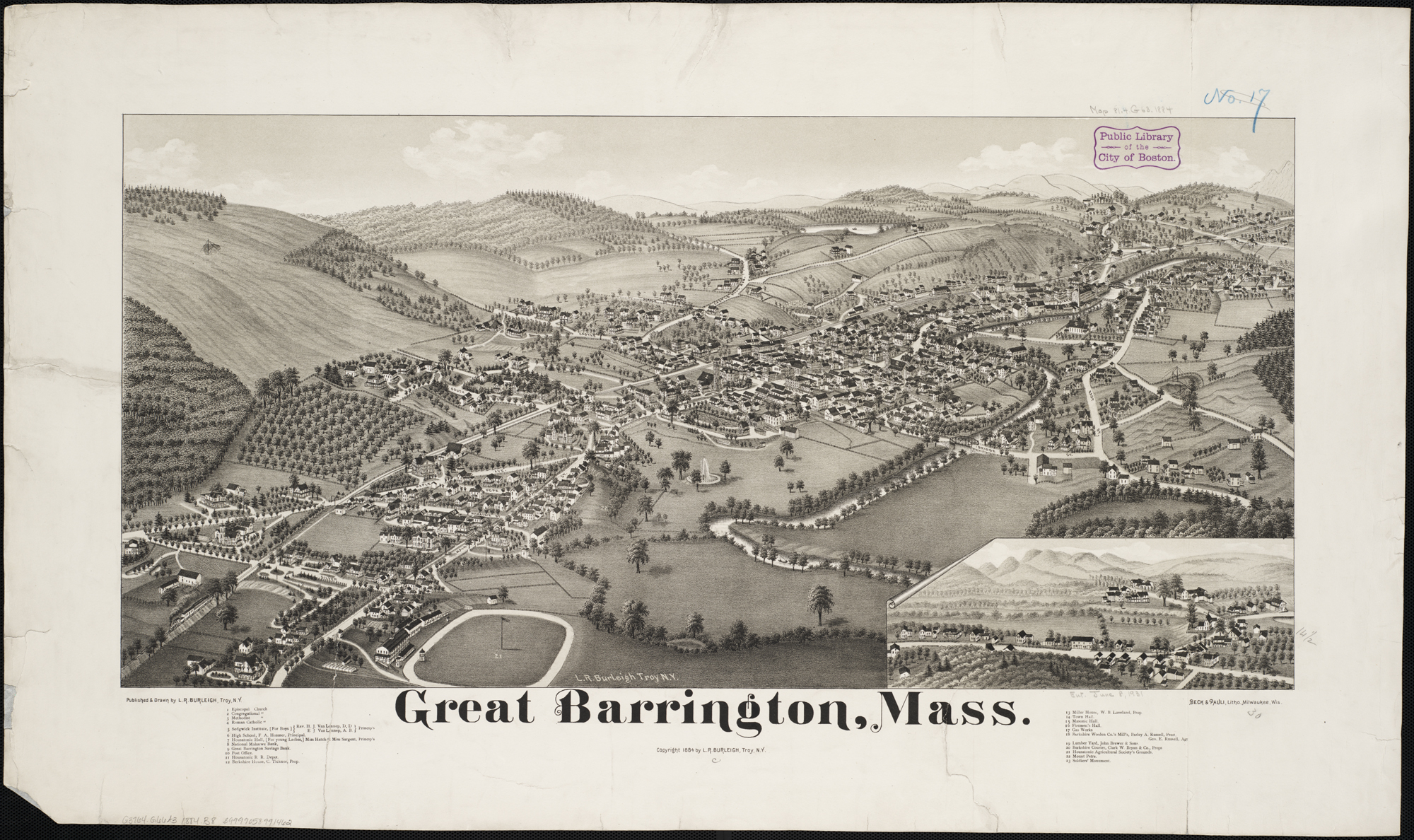
Print of Great Barrington from 1884 by L.R. Burleigh, with listing of landmarks

=== 1676–1995 ===
The Mahican Indians called the area Mahaiwe, meaning "the place downstream". It lay on the New England Path, which connected Fort Orange near Albany, New York, with Springfield and Massachusetts Bay.

The first recorded account of Europeans in the area happened in August 1676, during King Philip's War. Major John Talcott and his troops chased a group of 200 Mahican Natives west from Westfield, eventually overtaking them at the Housatonic River in what is now Great Barrington. According to reports at the time, Talcott's troops killed twenty-five Indians and imprisoned another twenty. Today, a plaque for John Talcott marks the spot where the massacre is believed to have happened.

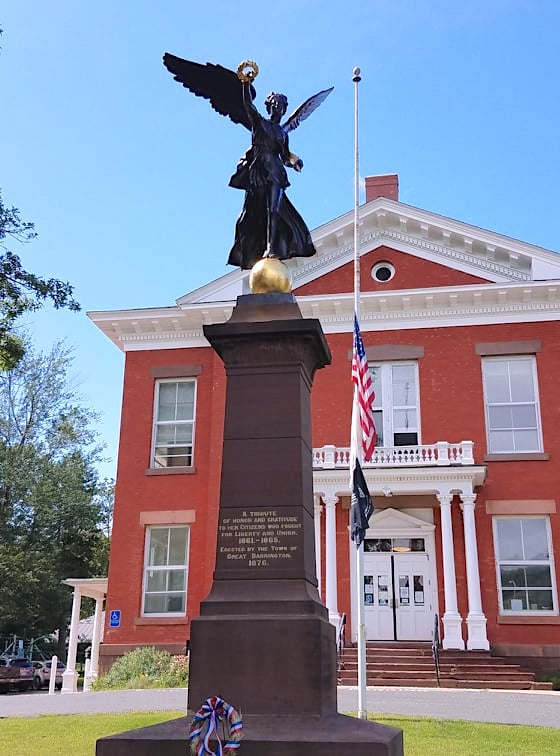
Civil War Monument, in front of the town hall

On April 25, 1724, Captain John Ashley of Westfield, Massachusetts, bought on behalf of himself and a committee of the Massachusetts General Court the land that became the towns of Great Barrington, Sheffield, Egremont, Alford, Mount Washington, and Boston Corner for £460, three barrels of "sider," and thirty quarts of rum from 21 Native American sachems headed by Conkepot Poneyote. The Konkapot River in southwestern Massachusetts is named after him.

The village was first settled by colonists in 1726 and from 1742 to 1761 was the north parish of Sheffield. In 1761, it was officially incorporated as Great Barrington, named after the village of Great Barrington in Gloucestershire, England.

In the summer of 1774, local colonists temporarily forced the closure of the Berkshire County Court in response to unpopular British policies. In the winter of 1776, Henry Knox passed through Great Barrington while transporting the "noble train of artillery" from Fort Ticonderoga to the outskirts of Boston during the siege of Boston. Due to his time in the area, he established an agricultural interest in the area of Great Barrington.

With the arrival of the railroad in the late 19th century, Great Barrington developed as a Gilded Age resort community for those seeking relief from the heat and pollution of cities. Wealthy families built grand homes called Berkshire Cottages here, as others would in Lenox and Stockbridge.

Among the earliest estates was one built by New York City banker, industrialist and art patron David Leavitt, who built an elaborate 300-acre (1.2 km^{2}) estate, and was soon followed by those of his sons nearby. Leavitt was instrumental in the development of the local Housatonic Railroad, serving as its president.

Later estates included Searles Castle, commissioned in 1888 by the widow of Mark Hopkins together with her second husband, Edward Francis Searles, and "Brookside", built for William Hall Walker. In 1895, Colonel William L. Brown, part owner of the New York Daily News, presented Great Barrington with a statue of a newsboy, now a landmark on the western edge of town.

==== World's first alternating current/transformer system ====
In November 1885 electrical engineer William Stanley, Jr., a sometime Great Barrington resident working for George Westinghouse, began installing a demonstration transformer based alternating current lighting system. Stanley felt alternating current was an improvement over the direct current system being used by Thomas Edison. Stanley was trying to get Westinghouse to adopt it. Stanley had developed a series transformer he thought would make alternating current practical. He built his components at the "Old Rubber Factory" south of Cottage Street and installed a Westinghouse steam engine powering a 500 volt Siemens generator. Stringing the power lines from tree to tree down the street, in March 1886 Stanley powered the system up and was able to expand it to the point where it could light 23 businesses along Main Street with very little power loss over 4,000 ft (1,200 m). Using the new Stanley transformers, at each location, the system's 500 volts were stepped down to 100 volts which was used to power incandescent lamps. This was the world's first practical demonstration of an alternating current with transformers system. It was the basis of the alternating current systems Westinghouse would begin installing later that year.

==== Alice's Restaurant ====
Arlo Guthrie's song "Alice's Restaurant," which runs for 18 1/2 minutes, is based on true-life events of the mid-20th century in Great Barrington and the adjoining towns of Stockbridge and Lee. The Old Trinity Church, which was the home of Ray and Alice Brock at the time of these incidents, is now owned by Guthrie, and is at 4 Van Deusenville Road in Great Barrington.

=== Recent history ===
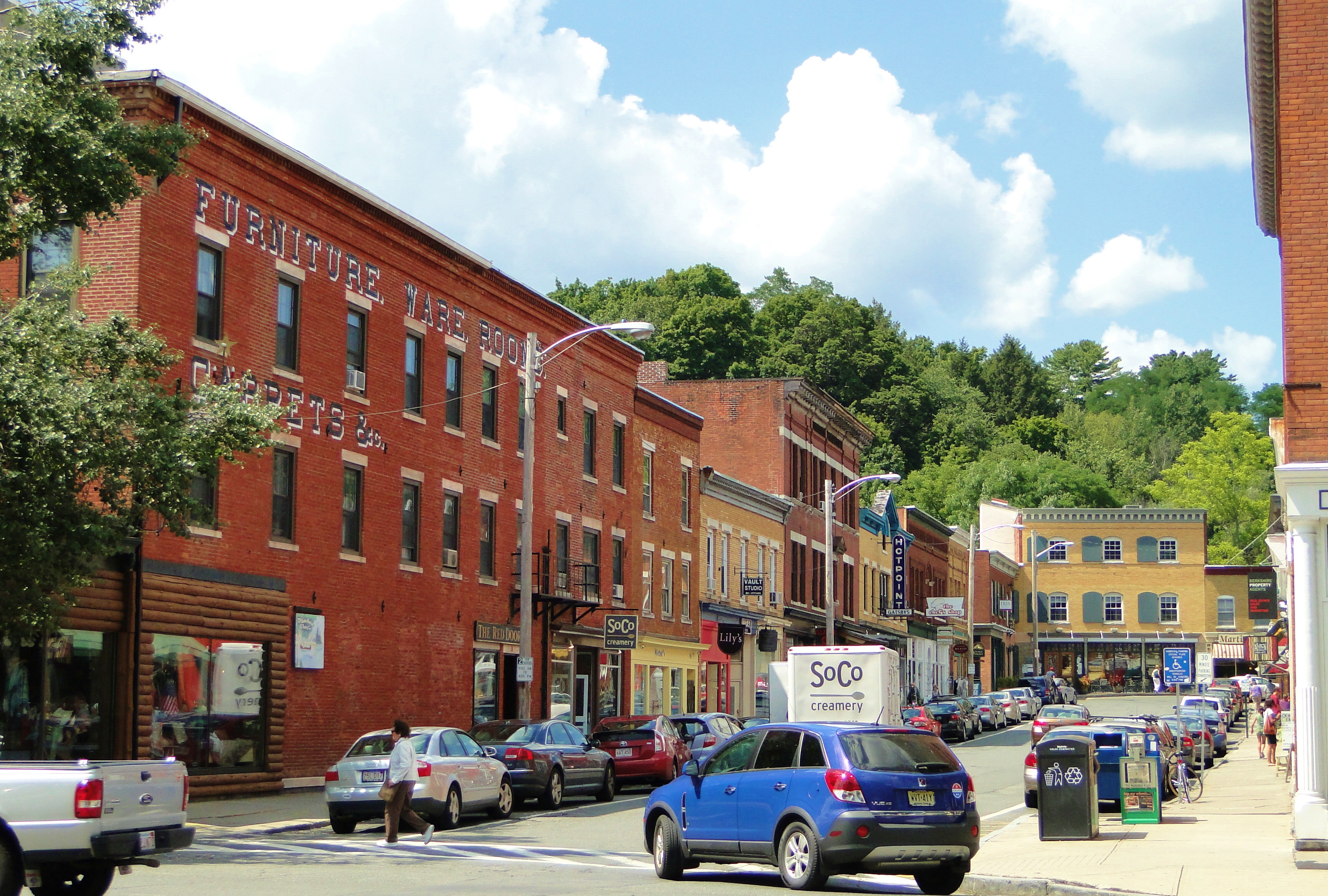
Railroad Street, where many restaurants and business are located

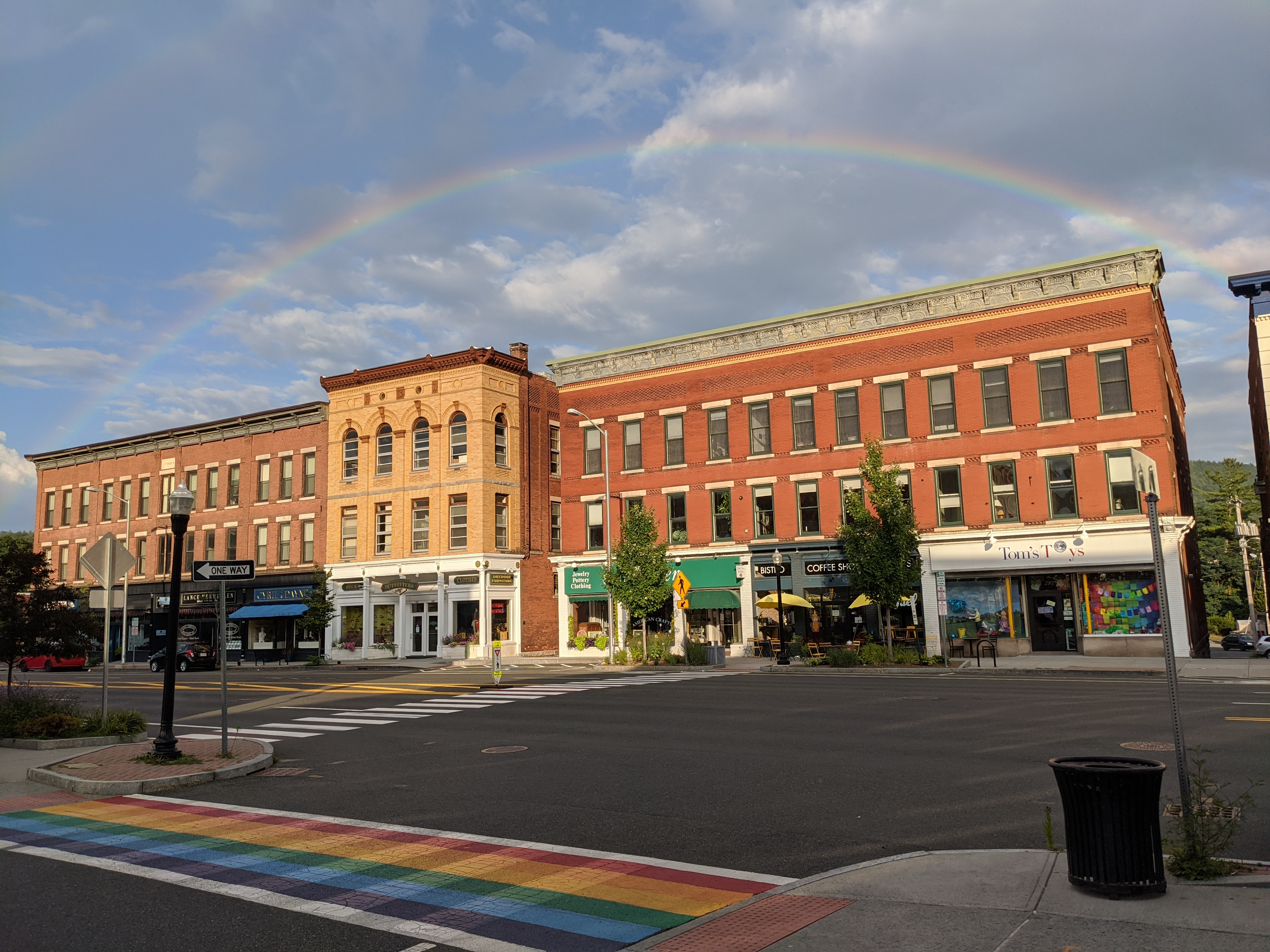
Main Street

The town was the site of an F4 tornado around 7:00 pm on Memorial Day, May 29, 1995. The tornado killed three people and caused damage in the area.

On July 24, 2009, Great Barrington was named an Appalachian Trail Community by application and acceptance by the Appalachian Trail Conservancy.

On June 1, 2010, a new fire station was opened for the Great Barrington Fire Department, located on Route 7. The new fire station replaced the old one, on Castle Street. It had deteriorated and was too small for the growing needs of the fire department. The new $9.1 million facility was planned as a center for community events such as elections. It serves as the hub for emergency operations in southern Berkshire County.

The town celebrated its 250th anniversary with a large parade on July 10, 2011. Other events celebrating the 250th anniversary were held throughout the year as well.

The "Main Street Reconstruction Project" was launched in 2011, involving major improvements along Main Street between Saint James Place and Cottage Street. The plan elements include new pavement, new sidewalks, sewer and utility improvements, and the removal of the large pear trees that span Main Street, to be replaced with a much wider array of trees of varying sizes and growth habits. The project had finished its design phase as of 2012, and construction was to be completed in 2016.

In 2023 the town made national news after plainclothes police conducted a search of the WEB DuBois Regional Middle School based on an anonymous tip that someone in the school possessed a copy of the book Gender Queer: A Memoir.

== Geography ==
According to the United States Census Bureau, the town has an area of 45.8 square miles (118.6 km^{2}), of which 44.8 square miles (116.1 km^{2}) is land and 0.97 square miles (2.5 km^{2}), or 2.09%, is water. Great Barrington is bordered by West Stockbridge, Stockbridge and Lee to the north, Tyringham to the northeast, Monterey to the east, New Marlborough to the southeast, Sheffield to the south, Egremont to the southwest, and Alford to the northwest. The town is 20 miles (32 km) south of Pittsfield, 46 miles (74 km) west of Springfield, 135 miles (217 km) west of Boston, and 120 miles (190 km) north-northeast of New York City.

Great Barrington is in the valley of the Housatonic River. The Williams River, Green River and several brooks also flow through the valley into the Housatonic. To the east of the river, several mountains of the Berkshires rise, including East Mountain (site of the Ski Butternut resort (also known as Butternut Basin) and a state forest), Beartown Mountain (and the majority of Beartown State Forest) and Monument Mountain. The Appalachian Trail crosses through East Mountain State Forest in the southeast corner of town. The southwest corner of town is the site of several country clubs and a fairgrounds.

U.S. Route 7 passes through the center of town, and was once part of New England Interstate Route 4 (also known as the New York-Berkshire-Burlington Way). Massachusetts Route 23 passes from west to east through town, combining with Massachusetts Route 41 and U.S. Route 7 in the western part of town and Massachusetts Route 183 in the eastern part of town, which also follows part of the path of Route 7 northward from Route 23 before splitting towards the village of Housatonic. Great Barrington is approximately 12 miles (19 km) south of Exit 2 of Interstate 90 (the Massachusetts Turnpike), the nearest interstate highway.

=== Climate ===
Climate data for Great Barrington, Massachusetts (1981–2010 normals)
Month	Jan	Feb	Mar	Apr	May	Jun	Jul	Aug	Sep	Oct	Nov	Dec	Year
Mean daily maximum °F (°C)	33 (1)	36 (2)	45 (7)	58 (14)	69 (21)	78 (26)	82 (28)	81 (27)	72 (22)	60 (16)	49 (9)	38 (3)	58 (15)
Mean daily minimum °F (°C)	14 (−10)	16 (−9)	24 (−4)	35 (2)	46 (8)	55 (13)	59 (15)	57 (14)	49 (9)	38 (3)	31 (−1)	21 (−6)	37 (3)
Average precipitation inches (mm)	3.39 (86)	2.98 (76)	3.62 (92)	3.99 (101)	4.53 (115)	4.40 (112)	4.57 (116)	4.47 (114)	4.14 (105)	4.69 (119)	3.95 (100)	3.90 (99)	48.63 (1,235)

== Demographics ==
Historical population
Year	Pop.	±%
1790	1,373	—
1850	3,264	+137.7%
1860	3,871	+18.6%
1870	4,320	+11.6%
1880	4,653	+7.7%
1890	4,012	−13.8%
1900	5,854	+45.9%
1910	5,926	+1.2%
1920	6,315	+6.6%
1930	5,934	−6.0%
1940	5,824	−1.9%
1950	6,712	+15.2%
1960	6,624	−1.3%
1970	7,537	+13.8%
1980	7,405	−1.8%
1990	7,725	+4.3%
2000	7,527	−2.6%
2010	7,104	−5.6%
2020	7,172	+1.0%
2022*	7,214	+0.6%
* = population estimate. Source: United States census records and Population Estimates Program data.

As of the census of 2000, there were 7,527 people, 3,008 households, and 1,825 families residing in the town. By population, the town ranks fifth out of the 32 cities and towns in Berkshire County, and 202nd out of 351 cities and towns in Massachusetts. The population density was 166.6 inhabitants per square mile (64.3/km^{2}), ranking it eighth in the county and 268th in the Commonwealth. There were 3,352 housing units at an average density of 74.2 per square mile (28.6/km^{2}). The racial makeup of the town was 94.74% White, 2.09% Black or African American, 0.16% Native American, 1.25% Asian, 0.03% Pacific Islander, 0.70% from other races, and 1.04% from two or more races. Hispanic or Latino people of any race were 2.07% of the population. 17% were of Irish descent, 12% Italian, 11% German, 10% English and 9% Polish.

There were 3,008 households, of which 27.3% had children under the age of 18 living with them, 45.8% were married couples living together, 11.5% had a female householder with no husband present, and 39.3% were non-families. 32.6% of all households were made up of individuals, and 13.3% had someone living alone who was 65 years of age or older. The average household size was 2.28 and the average family size was 2.89.

In the town, the population was spread out, with 22.6% under the age of 18, 9.0% from 18 to 24, 23.5% from 25 to 44, 26.2% from 45 to 64, and 18.8% who were 65 years of age or older. The median age was 42 years. For every 100 females, there were 87.2 males. For every 100 females age 18 and over, there were 83.8 males.

The town's median household income was $95,490, and the median family income was $103,135. Males had a median income of $68,163 versus $49,474 for females. The town's per capita income was $42,655. About 2.4% of families and 5.2% of the population were below the poverty line, including 3.6% of those under age 18 and 2.5% of those age 65 or over.

== Economy ==
Great Barrington is the location of the Ski Butternut resort. The Berkshire Humane Society operates animal welfare services and pet adoption facilities in the town.

== Arts and culture ==
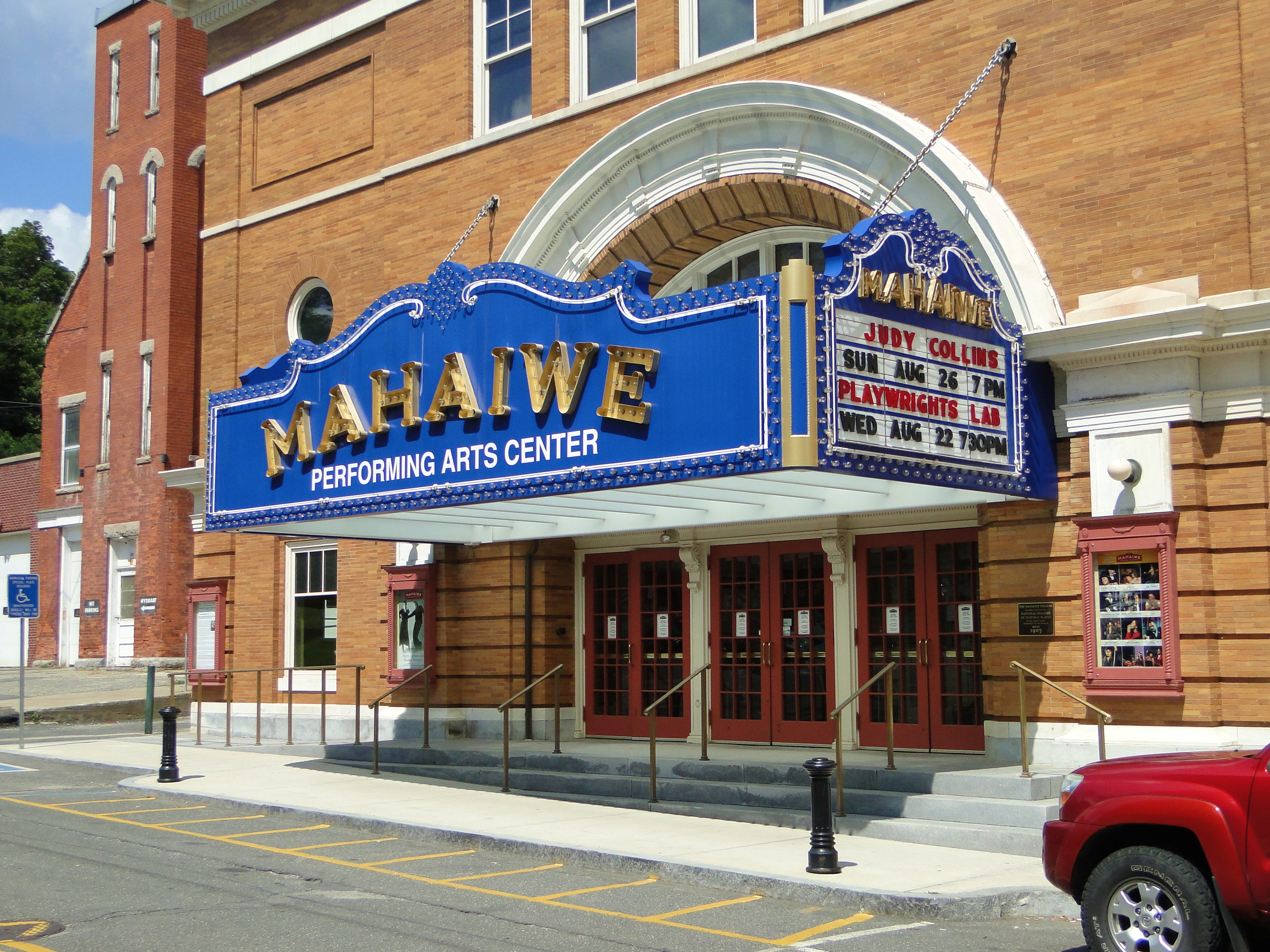
The Mahaiwe Theater

=== Sites of interest ===
- Bard College at Simon's Rock
- First Congregational Church of Great Barrington
- Mahaiwe Performing Arts Center
- Monument Mountain
- Searles Castle
- W.E.B. Du Bois Boyhood Homesite

== Government ==
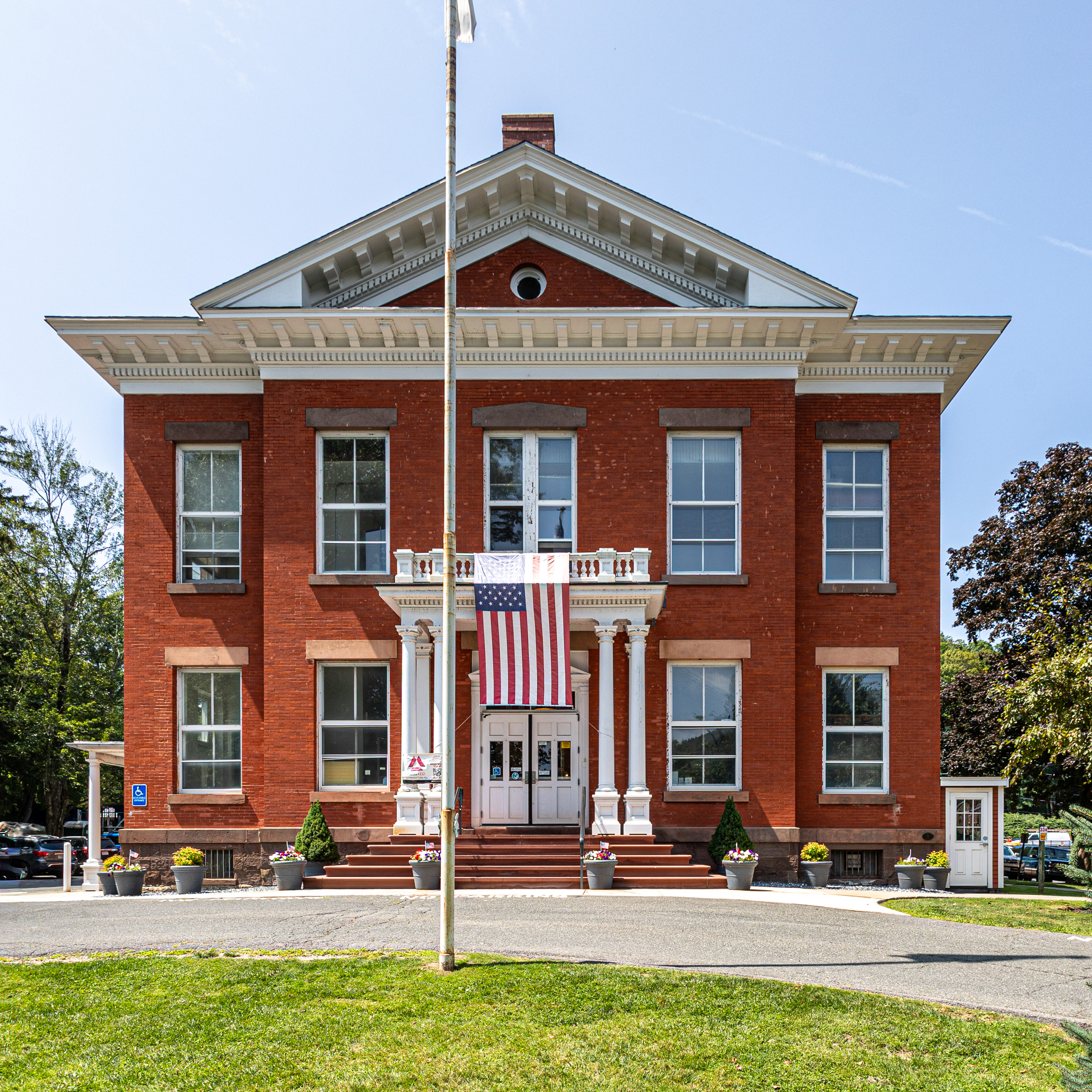
Town Hall

Great Barrington employs the open town meeting form of government, and is led by a board of selectmen and a town manager. Great Barrington has its own public services, including police, fire and public works departments.

The town has two libraries, with the main branch, Mason Library, at 231 Main Street in Great Barrington, and a branch library, Ramsdell Library, at 1087 Main Street in the village of Housatonic, both of which are part of the regional library network. The town is home to Southern Berkshire District Court, as well as Fairview Hospital, the largest hospital in the southern end of the county (based on the number of beds).

On the state level, Great Barrington is represented in the Massachusetts House of Representatives by the Third Berkshire district, which covers southern Berkshire County. In the Massachusetts Senate, the town is represented by the Berkshire, Hampden, Franklin and Hampshire district, which includes all of Berkshire County and western Hampden, Hampshire, and Franklin counties. The town is patrolled by the Great Barrington Police Department, which is a 24/7/365 service.

On the national level, Great Barrington is represented in the United States House of Representatives as part of Massachusetts's 1st congressional district. Democrat Richard Neal of Springfield has represented the district since 2012.

Great Barrington has a paid-by-call fire department, the Great Barrington Fire Department (GBFD), which has about 40 members, five pumpers, one tower ladder, two rescue vehicles, and one brush truck. Most members are trained to the first responder level; some are trained to the EMT-Basic level. The department responds to about 600 calls per year, which vary but are mainly fire alarm activations and medical emergencies.

Great Barrington's emergency medical services are covered by Southern Berkshire Volunteer Ambulance Squad Inc. (SBVAS), operated from the grounds of Fairview Hospital. The service provides 24/7/365 paramedic level service to the towns of Great Barrington, Housatonic, Alford, Egremont, Sheffield, Ashley Falls, Monterey, and Mount Washington. SBVAS is the primary paramedic intercept service for ambulances going into Fairview, including New Marlborough, Sandisfield, and Otis. The squad consists of a mix of full-time EMTs, paramedics, and volunteer EMTs. The squad responds to 3,000 to 5,000 calls a year.

=== Local currency ===
Great Barrington offers the use of its own local currency, called BerkShare notes. There are about 844,000 BerkShare notes in circulation, worth about $801,800 at the exchange rate of one BerkShare to 95 U.S. cents, according to program organizers. The paper money is available in denominations of one, five, ten, twenty, and fifty. Proponents say the currency gets residents to shop at local stores. Local areas may have their own currencies as long as they do not resemble the United States dollar and are in paper only.

== Great Barrington Declaration ==
Great Barrington plays host to the American Institute for Economic Research. AIER was founded in 1933 as a non-profit scientific and educational organization. Originally at MIT, it relocated to the southern shore of Great Barrington's Long Pond in 1946. In October 2020 the Institute held a meeting of epidemiologists, economists and journalists to discuss government responses to the COVID-19 pandemic. The result was the Great Barrington Declaration, signed at the Institute's headquarters on October 4, 2020, and released to the public the following day, which advocated an alternative, risk-based approach to the pandemic involving "focused protection" of those most at risk and seeking to avoid or minimize the societal harm of lockdowns.

== Education ==
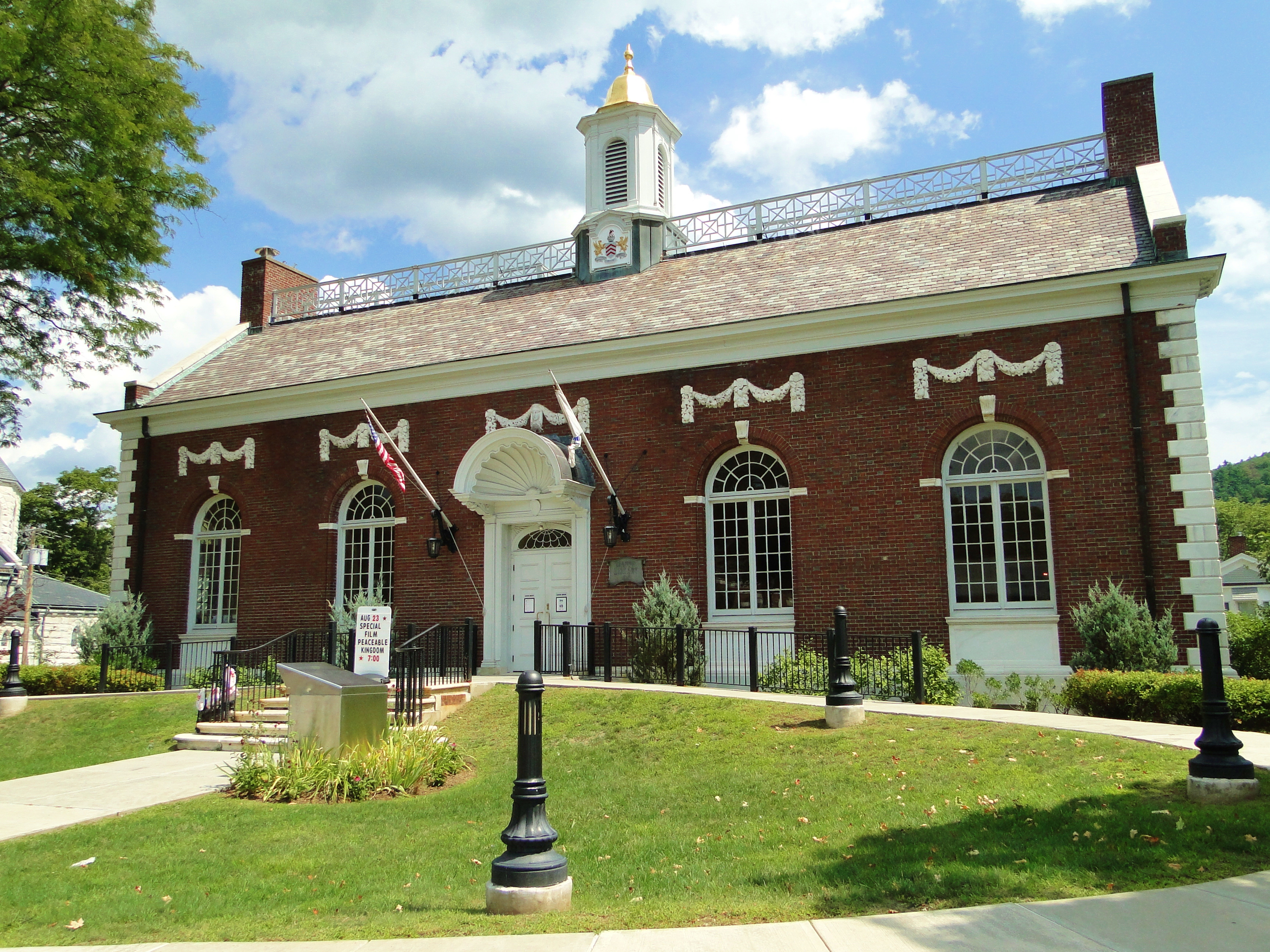
Mason Library

Great Barrington is the largest town in the Berkshire Hills Regional School District, which includes the towns of Stockbridge and West Stockbridge, and the villages of Housatonic, Glendale and Interlaken. All three school levels are in Great Barrington. Muddy Brook Regional Elementary School offers pre-kindergarten through fourth grade classes and is off Route 7 in the northern part of town. W.E.B Du Bois Regional Middle School offers grades five through eight. Monument Mountain Regional High School (MMRHS) opened in 1968, consolidating the former Searles High School in Great Barrington and Williams High School in Stockbridge, and serves the high school students of the district.

The town is home to several private schools, including the Rudolf Steiner School, the Great Barrington Waldorf High School, and the John Dewey Academy.

Bard College at Simon's Rock was previously located in Great Barrington; it moved to Barrytown, New York, in 2025.

== Media ==
Two radio stations are located in Great Barrington:

- WSBS 860 kHz
- WBCR-LP 97.7 MHz (local variety)

== Infrastructure ==
=== Transportation ===
US Route 7 serves as the Main Street in Great Barrington. The town is located about 7 miles (11 kilometers) south of I-90 and the Massachusetts Turnpike, the nearest Interstate Highway.

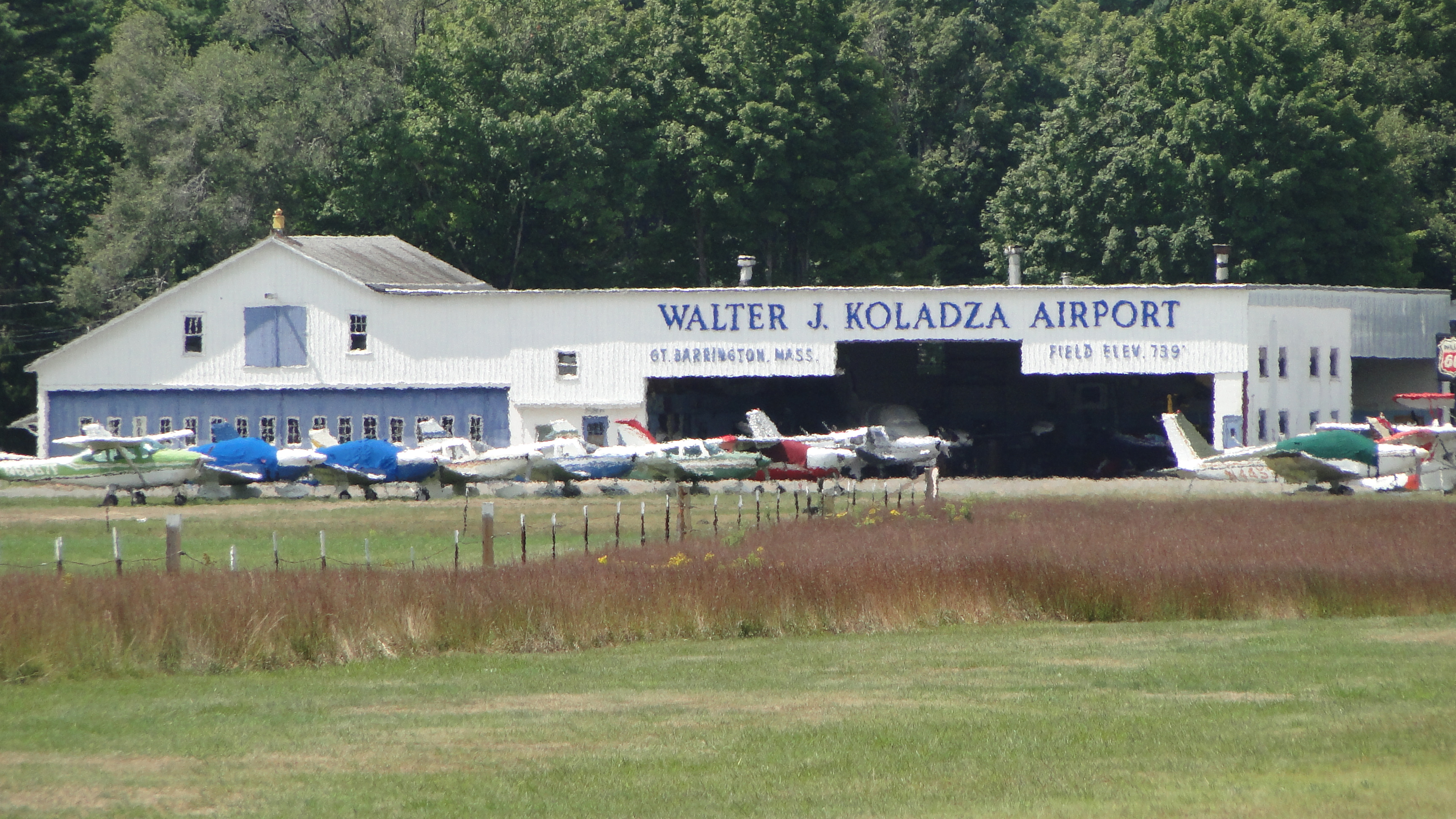
Walter J. Koladza Airport

=== Ground ===
Great Barrington is served by the Berkshire Regional Transit Authority, which offers bus transportation throughout Berkshire County. Peter Pan Bus Lines and Greyhound Lines have stops in Great Barrington for long-range bus transportation. The town lies along the Housatonic Railroad line, which roughly follows Route 7 and the river through southern New England.

=== Air ===
Walter J. Koladza Airport is in Great Barrington, and features a full service FBO for general aviation aircraft. The closest major airports are Albany, New York and Bradley near Hartford, Connecticut.

== Notable people ==
- Karen Allen, actress known for Raiders of the Lost Ark
- Lionel Barthold, electrical engineer
- Jim Bouton, major league pitcher
- Caroline Burghardt, Civil War nurse
- André Frédéric Cournand, physician and physiologist
- Phyllis Curtin, classical soprano
- Benjamin Downing, former state senator
- W. E. B. Du Bois, academic, scholar, activist, journalist, sociologist
- Yolande Du Bois, educator, daughter of W. E. B. Du Bois
- Jackson C. Frank, folk musician
- Michel Gill, actor known for House of Cards
- Cynthia Roberts Gorton, writer
- Thomas Ingersoll, founder of Ingersoll, Ontario; Laura Secord's father
- Anson Jones, doctor, businessperson, member of Congress, and last President of the Republic of Texas
- Pauline Kael, film critic, The New Yorker
- Rick E. Lawrence, associate justice of the Maine Supreme Judicial Court
- Hamish Linklater, actor
- Ed Mann, percussionist, drummer
- Dorinda Medley, notable for role on The Real Housewives of New York City
- Matthew Meier, DJ and music producer, 1/2 of dubstep and bass music duo Barely Alive
- Fantastic Negrito, Grammy-winning blues musician
- Chris Noth, actor notable for roles in the TV shows Sex and the City, Law and Order and The Good Wife
- Franklin Pope, electrical engineer and inventor
- Shorty Rogers, jazz trumpeter and one of the principal creators of West Coast jazz
- John Schroeder, golfer
- Laura Secord, warned the British of an impending American attack on Canada
- Mark H. Sibley, U.S. congressman
- William Watkins, DJ and music producer, 1/2 of dubstep and bass music duo Barely Alive

== Sister cities ==
Great Barrington has the following sister cities:

- Ingersoll, Ontario, Canada
- Fada N'gourma, Burkina Faso

== See also ==
- Great Barrington Declaration
