= Egremont, Massachusetts =

- Town
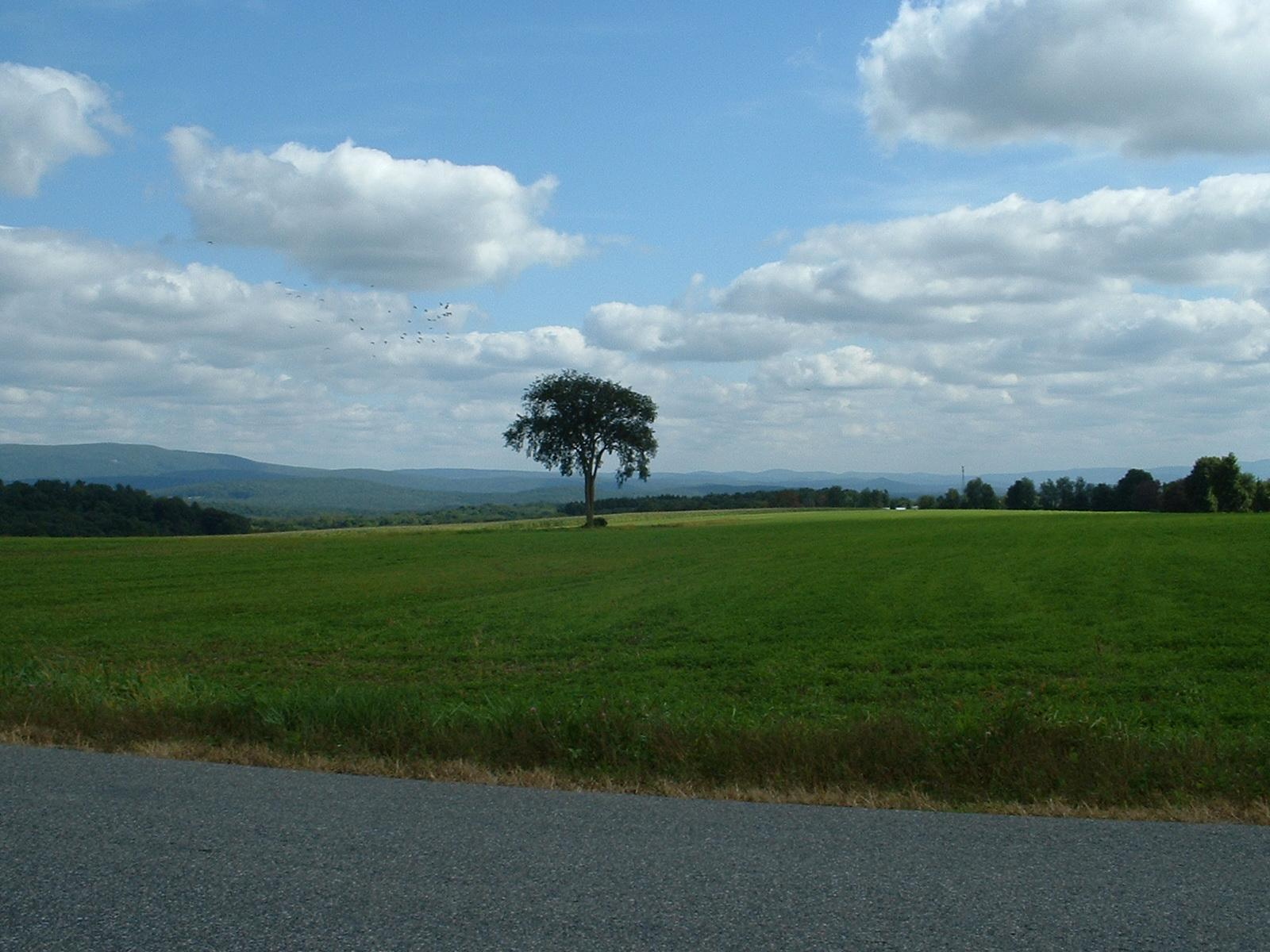
- The fields of Egremont Plain, looking northeastward towards the southern Berkshires

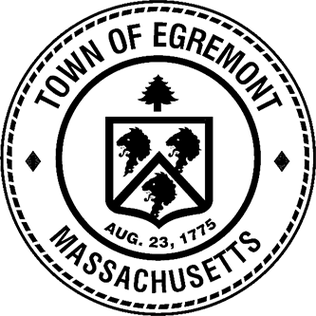
- Seal

- Location in Berkshire County and the state of Massachusetts.
- Coordinates: 42°11′05″N 73°24′52″W
- Country: United States
- State: Massachusetts
- County: Berkshire
- Settled: 1722
- Incorporated: 1775

Government
  - Type: Open town meeting

Area
  - Total: 18.9 sq mi (49.0 km^{2})
  - Land: 18.7 sq mi (48.4 km^{2})
  - Water: 0.23 sq mi (0.6 km^{2})
- Elevation: 748 ft (228 m)

Population (2020)
  - Total: 1,372
  - Density: 73.4/sq mi (28.3/km^{2})
- Time zone: UTC−5 (Eastern)
  - Summer (DST): UTC−4 (Eastern)
- ZIP Codes: 01230 (Egremont); 01258 (South Egremont)
- Area code: 413
- FIPS code: 25-21360
- GNIS feature ID: 0618265
- Website: www.egremont-ma.gov

Egremont /ˈɛɡrəˌmɒnt/ is a town in Berkshire County, Massachusetts, United States. It is part of the Pittsfield, Massachusetts Metropolitan Statistical Area. The population was 1,372 at the 2020 census. Egremont consists of two villages, North Egremont and South Egremont, and their outlying areas, which are mostly lightly settled forests and farmland.

== History ==
Egremont was first settled in 1722 by Dutch settlers from New York. English settlers arrived a few years later, and the town was officially incorporated by Massachusetts in 1761. It is unclear whether the town is named for the English town or for Charles Wyndham, 2nd Earl of Egremont, Secretary of State for the Southern Department (responsible for the administration of the American colonies) at the time of incorporation. For much of its history, Egremont has been an agricultural town, with only a small milling area around South Egremont.

Around New Year's Day, 1776, General Henry Knox passed through the town with cannons from Fort Ticonderoga, which he was bringing to help end the Siege of Boston. Today, the path is known as the Knox Trail, and a historical marker is located in the village of North Egremont.

== Geography ==
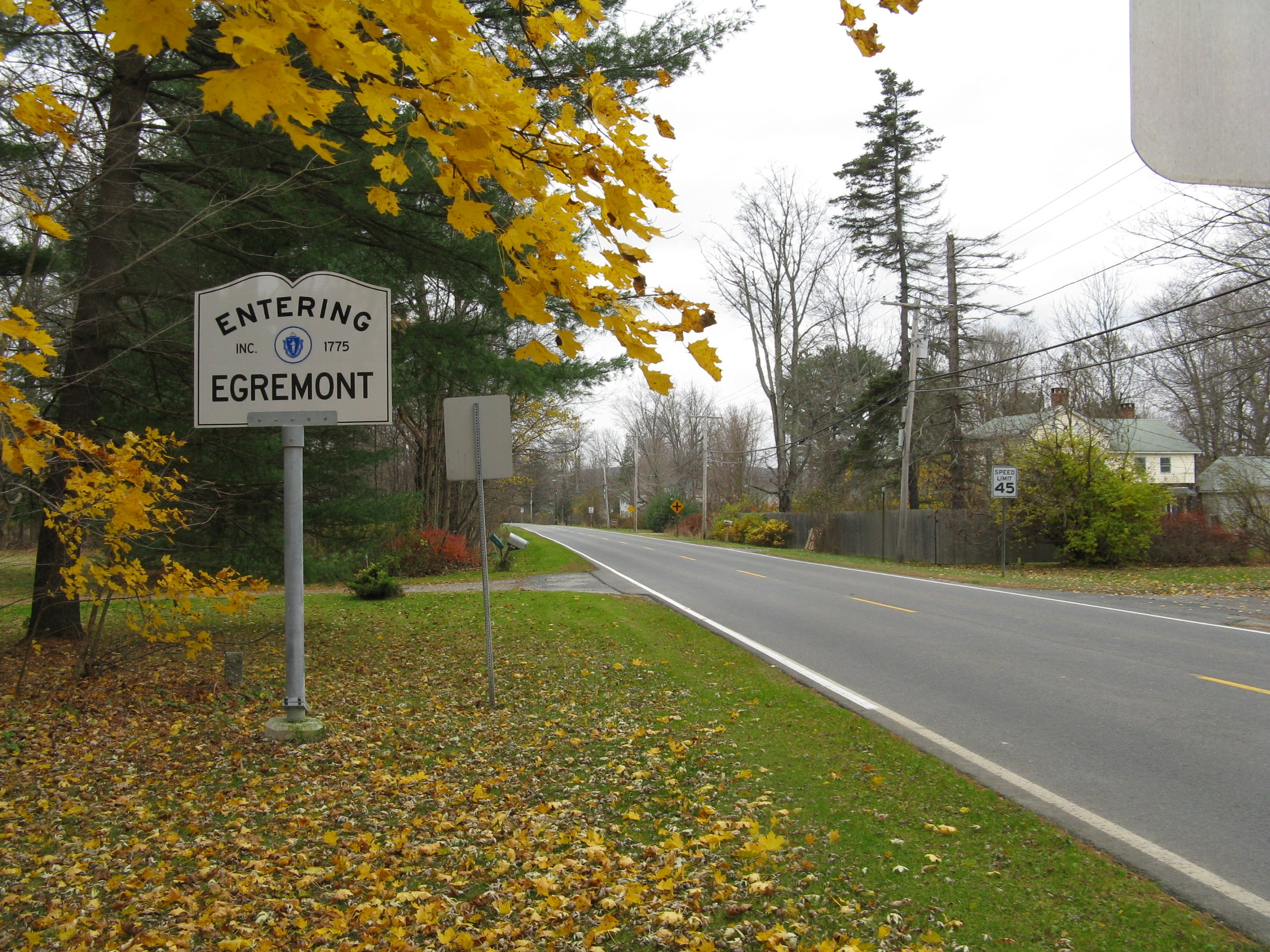
Route 71 westbound entering Egremont

According to the United States Census Bureau, the town has a total area of 18.9 square miles (49.0 km^{2}), of which 18.7 square miles (48.4 km^{2}) is land and 0.23 square miles (0.6 km^{2}), or 1.26%, is water. Egremont lies along the western border of Berkshire County and Massachusetts, with Columbia County, New York, to the west. The town is bordered by Alford to the north, Great Barrington to the east, Sheffield to the southeast, Mount Washington to the southwest, and Copake and Hillsdale, New York, to the west. Egremont is 23 miles (37 km) south-southwest of Pittsfield, 50 miles (80 km) west of Springfield, 140 miles (230 km) west of Boston, and 48 miles (77 km) southeast of Albany, New York.

Egremont is situated in a valley east of the Taconic Range. To the southwest, Mount Whitbeck divides the town from Mount Washington, and to the west, Mount Fray and several other mountains divide the town from New York. Mount Fray is the site of Catamount Mountain Resort, a ski area that straddles the Massachusetts–New York state line between Egremont, Massachusetts, and Hillsdale, New York. The resort offers alpine skiing and snowboarding and is one of a small number of ski areas in the United States whose terrain extends across a state boundary. The mountain’s summit is in Massachusetts, while portions of the resort’s ski terrain extend westward into New York."Trail Map". Catamount Mountain Resort. Catamount also operates summer attractions, including an aerial adventure park and a zipline tour."Summer". Catamount Mountain Resort. Mount Whitbeck and its neighbor, the Jug End, make up the Jug End State Reservation and Wildlife Management Area. The Appalachian Trail extends through the reservation before turning east at the Jug End toward Great Barrington. The town lies along the Green River, a tributary of the Housatonic River. Several brooks also flow through the town, with one being dammed to form the Mill Pond in South Egremont.

In South Egremont, Massachusetts Route 23 and Route 41 meet just northeast of the Mill Pond, traveling together into Great Barrington. The western end of Route 23 is at the state border within town, where it becomes New York State Route 23. Massachusetts Route 71, which carries part of the Knox Trail, also passes through the town, from Alford to the north to Great Barrington to the east. The highway does not meet the other two, however, until well into Great Barrington. The nearest interstate, Interstate 90 (the Massachusetts Turnpike), is located north of town, with the nearest exit, the "turn-around" Exit 1, being 12 miles (19 km) to the north in West Stockbridge. There is no rail, bus or air service in town, with the nearest for all three being in Great Barrington. The nearest national air service can be found at Albany International Airport in Albany, New York.

== Demographics ==
Historical population
Year	Pop.	±%
1790	759	—
1850	1,013	+33.5%
1860	1,079	+6.5%
1870	931	−13.7%
1880	875	−6.0%
1890	845	−3.4%
1900	758	−10.3%
1910	605	−20.2%
1920	441	−27.1%
1930	513	+16.3%
1940	468	−8.8%
1950	731	+56.2%
1960	895	+22.4%
1970	1,138	+27.2%
1980	1,311	+15.2%
1990	1,229	−6.3%
2000	1,345	+9.4%
2010	1,225	−8.9%
2020	1,372	+12.0%
2022*	1,374	+0.1%
* = population estimate. Source: United States census records and Population Estimates Program data.

As of the census of 2000, there were 1,345 people, 609 households, and 408 families residing in the town. By population, Egremont ranks twentieth out of the 32 cities and towns in Berkshire County, and 315th out of the 351 cities and towns in Massachusetts. The population density was 71.4 inhabitants per square mile (27.6/km^{2}), which ranks 16th in the county and 301st in the Commonwealth. There were 866 housing units at an average density of 46.0 per square mile (17.8/km^{2}). The racial makeup of the town was 98.36% European American, 0.07% African American, 0.07% Native American, 0.30% Asian, 0.30% from other races, and 0.89% from two or more races. Hispanic or Latino of any race were 1.04% of the population.

There were 609 households, out of which 22.8% had children under the age of 18 living with them, 54.0% were married couples living together, 10.0% had a female householder with no husband present, and 33.0% were non-families. 27.6% of all households were made up of individuals, and 11.2% had someone living alone who was 65 years of age or older. The average household size was 2.21 and the average family size was 2.67.

In the town, the population was spread out, with 18.3% under the age of 18, 4.7% from 18 to 24, 22.5% from 25 to 44, 34.6% from 45 to 64, and 20.0% who were 65 years of age or older. The median age was 47 years. For every 100 females, there were 92.4 males. For every 100 females age 18 and over, there were 90.8 males.

The median income for a household in the town was $50,000, and the median income for a family was $60,104. Males had a median income of $40,885 versus $31,875 for females. The per capita income for the town was $41,702. About 4.3% of families and 5.1% of the population were below the poverty line, including 3.6% of those under age 18 and 8.2% of those age 65 or over.

== Government ==
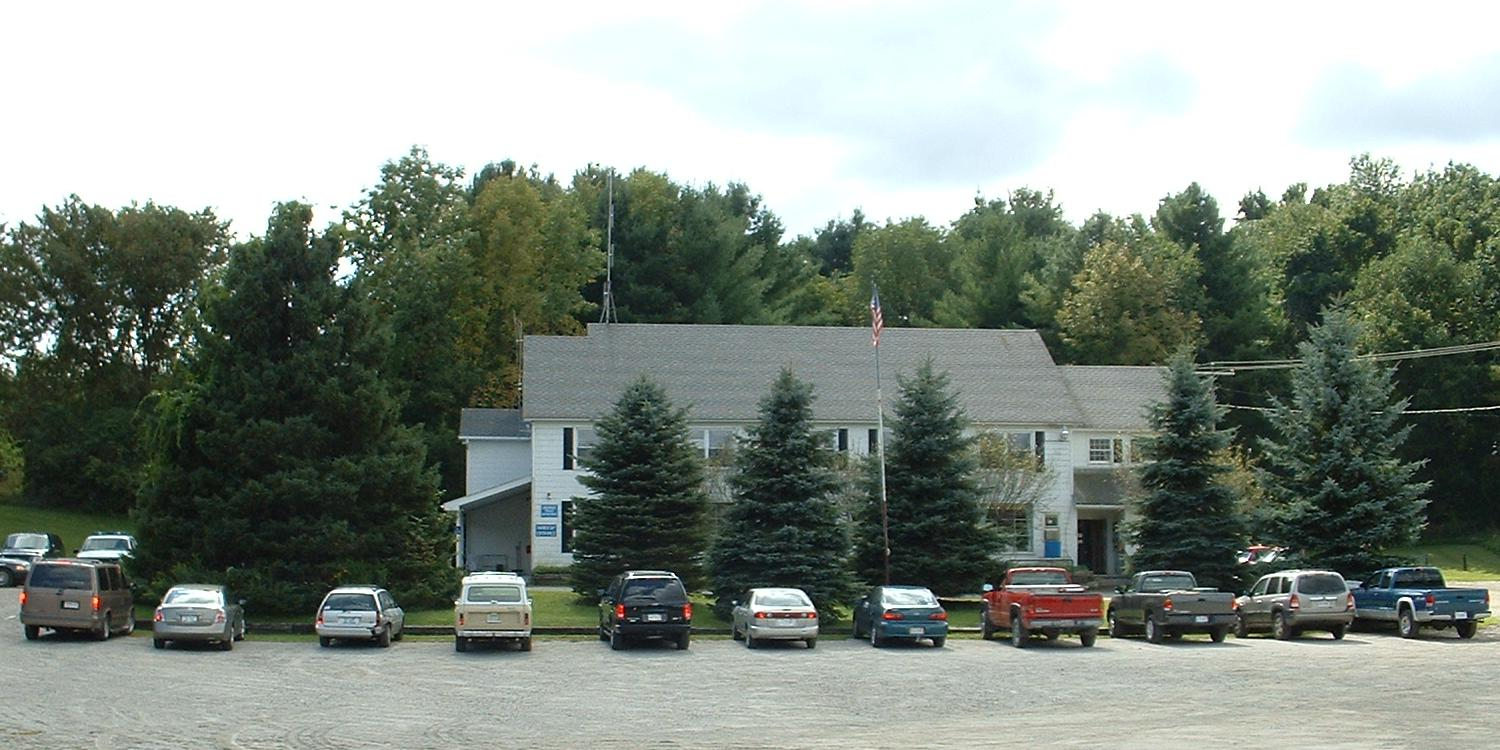
Egremont Town Hall

Egremont employs the open town meeting form of government, and is led by a board of selectmen and an administrative assistant. Egremont has its own police, fire and public works departments, and its post office also serves neighboring Mount Washington. The town's library, located in South Egremont, is connected to the regional library networks. A 150 acre public park, located in North Egremont, has tennis courts, ball fields, a modern children's playground, a dog park, a riding ring, hiking and equestrian trails, picnic shelters, and other features.

On the state level, Egremont is represented in the Massachusetts House of Representatives by the Fourth Berkshire district, which covers southern Berkshire County, as well as the westernmost towns in Hampden County. In the Massachusetts Senate, the town is represented by the Berkshire, Hampshire and Franklin district, which includes all of Berkshire County and western Hampshire and Franklin counties. The town employs a professional full-time Police Department, and recently completed its first stand alone Police facility. Egremont is also patrolled by the First (Lee) Station of Barracks "B" of the Massachusetts State Police.

On the national level, Egremont is represented in the United States House of Representatives as part of Massachusetts's 1st congressional district, and has been represented by Richard Neal of Springfield since January 2013.

== Education ==
Egremont is one of five towns that operate the Southern Berkshire Regional School District (neighboring Mount Washington also sends students to the district's schools). Kindergarten and first-grade students from Egremont and Mount Washington attend either the South Egremont School, a one-room school-house for early-kindergarten, kindergarten, and first grades, or the Undermountain Elementary School in Sheffield, which serves students in pre-kindergarten through fifth grade. Sixth- through twelfth-graders attend Mount Everett Regional School. There are private schools in adjacent Great Barrington, Sheffield, Salisbury and Lakeville (in Connecticut) and other nearby towns.

The nearest community college is the South County Center of Berkshire Community College in Great Barrington. The nearest state university is Westfield State University. The nearest private college is Williams College in Williamstown.
