= South Egremont Village Historic District =

Historic district in Massachusetts, United States

- U.S. National Register of Historic Places
- U.S. Historic district
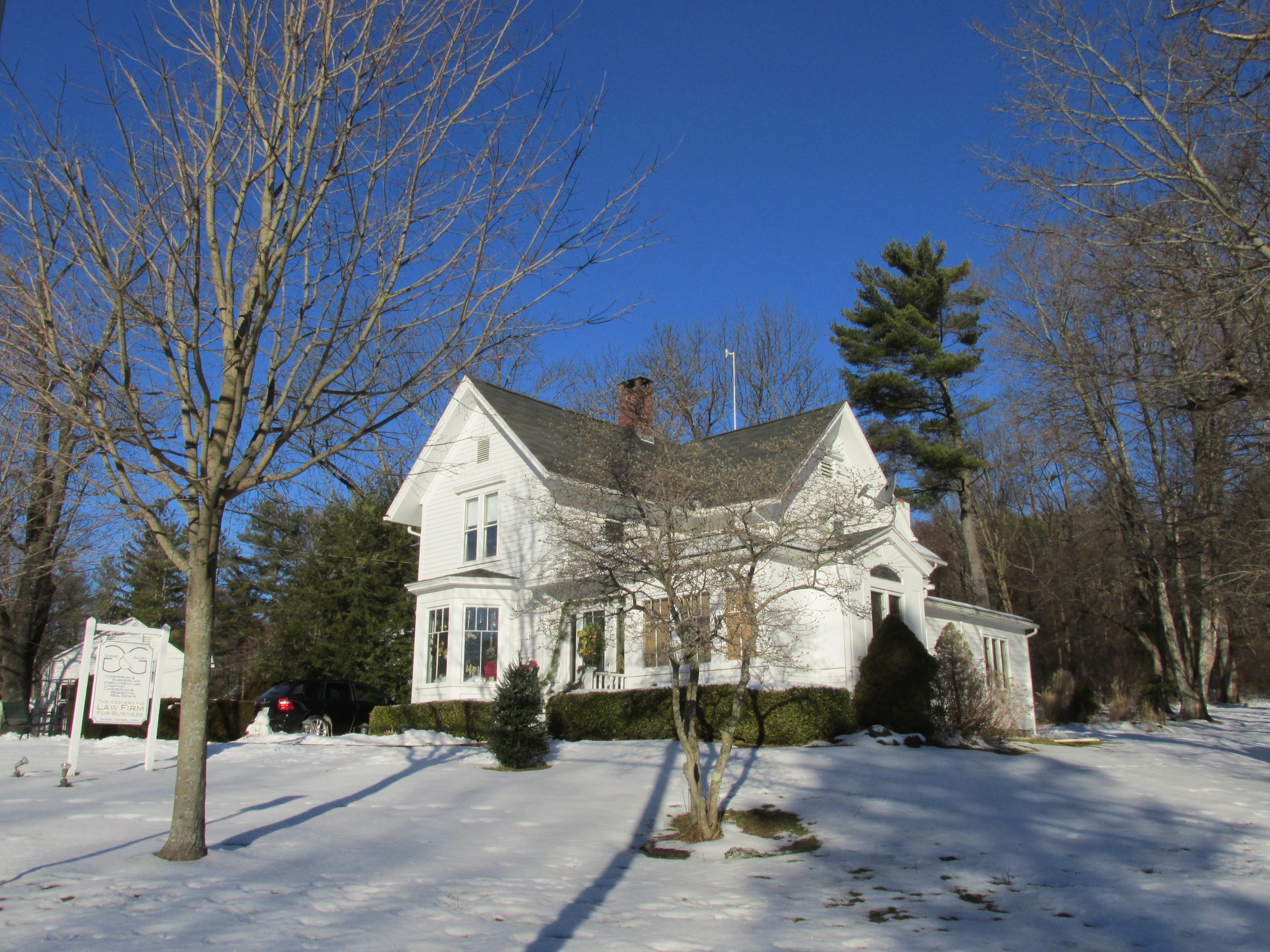
- John O'Neil House, c 1880

- Location within Massachusetts Location within the United States
- Location: South Egremont, Massachusetts
- Coordinates: 42°9′28″N 73°24′38″W
- Area: 375 acres (152 ha)
- Architectural style: Greek Revival, Late Victorian
- NRHP reference No.: 84002086
- Added to NRHP: May 31, 1984

The South Egremont Village Historic District encompasses most of the village of South Egremont, Massachusetts, a well-preserved village whose architecture has seen relatively little alteration since the 1840s. It is located along Massachusetts Route 23 in the plains east of the Taconic Mountains. The district was listed on the National Register of Historic Places in 1984.

== Description and history ==
Egremont was first settled beginning in the late 1730s, and was incorporated in 1761. The south village, located in a plain east of the Taconic Mountains, developed early as an agricultural village, with the waters of Karner Brook providing power for a sawmill in 1780. The village received an economic boost when the state of Massachusetts built a turnpike (now Massachusetts Route 23) through the area in 1801. This helped the village develop as a stopping point for travelers, and encouraged several small industries, most notably the manufacture of shoes and carriage axles, to develop along Karner Brook. In 1832 the Mt. Everett Academy opened in the village as the town's first secondary school; its surviving Greek Revival building is one of the finest of the type in the village, and later also served as the town hall and library. The village was economically stable in the second half of the 19th century, and declined economically in the early 20th century. Its fortunes were revived in the 1930s as a tourist destination by Hugh Smiley, who founded Olde Egremont as a vehicle to preserve the village's mid-19th century streetscape.

The historic district extends along Massachusetts Route 23 from its western junction with Massachusetts Route 41 in the west to its junction with the Sheffield-Egremont Road in the east, including a few buildings on adjacent roadways. This street alignment is roughly that of the 1801 turnpike, and is remarkably faithful to its appearance in 1844. On a map produced in that year there were 55 buildings, of which 44 are still standing, with only five subsequent additions to the village. In addition to the academy building, prominent buildings include the Egremont Village Inn (1780; moved 1801 to be closer to the turnpike), the 1832-33 Congregational church, whose horse sheds also survive nearby, the 1825 South Egremont Store, and the South Egremont Village School (1880), one of the last one-room schoolhouses in continuous operation in the United States. Of the district's historic industries, only the mill pond, dam and raceway survive at the western end of the village.

== See also ==
- National Register of Historic Places listings in Berkshire County, Massachusetts
