= U.S. Route 7 in Massachusetts =

Section of U.S. Highway in Massachusetts, United States

U.S. Route 7
- US 7 highlighted in red

Route information
- Maintained by MassDOT
- Length: 53.85 mi (86.66 km)

Major junctions
- South end: US 7 at the Connecticut state line in Ashley Falls
- Route 23 in Great Barrington; Route 102 in Stockbridge; US 20 from Lenox to Pittsfield; Route 9 in Pittsfield; Route 2 in Williamstown
- North end: US 7 at the Vermont state line in Williamstown

Location
- Country: United States
- State: Massachusetts
- Counties: Berkshire

Highway system
- United States Numbered Highway System; List; Special; Divided; Massachusetts State Highway System; Interstate; US; State
← Route 6A	→ Route 7A

U.S. Route 7 (US 7) in of Massachusetts is a 54-mile (87 km) section of the larger federal route extending from southern Connecticut to the northernmost part of Vermont. The entire route in Massachusetts is within Berkshire County.

== Route description ==
With a few exceptions, US 7 is mainly a two-lane rural road winding through the Berkshires, largely parallel to the Housatonic River. In Great Barrington, US 7 is briefly concurrent with Route 41 along Main Street, as well as with Route 183 on State Road. Further north, US 7 is concurrent with Route 102 along Main Street through the center of Stockbridge.

In the vicinity of Lenox, the route transitions to two-lane expressway around the historic center of town. While on this bypass route, it meets US 20, which travels southeast to Lee and the Massachusetts Turnpike. The two routes continue north via the bypass as a four-lane expressway, while Route 7A travels along Kemble and Main Streets via the original routing of the road. The three routes meet just north of the Lenox census-designated place boundary, with US 7/US 20 becoming a four-lane surface road until Pittsfield.

US 7 enters Pittsfield along South Street. At a signalized intersection with Housatonic Street, US 20 makes a left turn to continue west toward Albany. At Park Square, the route meets Route 9 near its western terminus, and the two routes share a two-block concurrency along East Street until US 7 makes a left turn to continue north.

US 7 leaves downtown Pittsfield as a two-lane surface road and continues as a rural highway with occasional three-lane stretches for climbing the grades along the Berkshires. It passes west of Mount Greylock before passing through Williamstown, connecting the Taconic Trail with the Mohawk Trail (Route 2). The road passes Williams College and crosses the Hoosic River one last time before entering Vermont.

== History ==
Like Connecticut, Massachusetts planned an Interstate-grade freeway (proposed Interstate 89) in the US 7 corridor. The only portion of this plan to be completed was the four-lane expressway section south of Lenox, although land takings for additional freeway sections occurred. The highway was ultimately canceled due to environmental and community opposition.

== Major intersections ==
The entire route is in Berkshire County.

Location	mi	km	Destinations	Notes
Sheffield	0.000	0.000	US 7 south to US 44 – Canaan	Continuation into Connecticut
Sheffield	1.906	3.067	Bridge over Housatonic River	
Sheffield	2.958	4.760	Route 7A south – Ashley Falls	Northern terminus of Route 7A; former routing of US 7
Community of Great Barrington	10.481	16.868	Route 23 west / Route 41 south – South Egremont, Hillsdale, NY	Roundabout; southern end of Route 23/Route 41 concurrency
Community of Great Barrington	11.451	18.429	Route 41 north – West Stockbridge	Northern end of Route 41 concurrency
Community of Great Barrington	11.451	18.429	Housatonic River	
Community of Great Barrington	11.944	19.222	Route 23 east / Route 183 south – Monterey, Springfield	Northern end of Route 23 concurrency; southern end of Route 183 concurrency
Town of Great Barrington	13.328	21.449	Route 183 north – Housatonic, Interlaken	Northern end of Route 183 concurrency
Town of Great Barrington	14.12	22.72	To Route 183 north – Housatonic, Interlaken	Access via Old Stockbridge Road
Stockbridge	17.806	28.656	Housatonic River	
Stockbridge	18.049	29.047	Route 102 west – West Stockbridge	Southern end of Route 102 concurrency
Stockbridge	18.405	29.620	Route 102 east – Lee	Northern end of Route 102 concurrency
Town of Lenox	21.524	34.640	Southern end of limited-access section	
Town of Lenox	22.251	35.810	Route 7A north – Historic Lenox	At-grade intersection; southern terminus of Route 7A; former routing of US 7
Town of Lenox	23.415	37.683	US 20 east to I-90 Toll / Mass Pike – Lee	At-grade intersection; southern end of US 20 concurrency
Community of Lenox	23.713	38.162	Route 183 south (Walker Street) – Historic Lenox, Tanglewood, October Mountain, Lenox Dale	At-grade intersection; northern terminus of Route 183
Community of Lenox	24.275	39.067	Housatonic Street – Lenox Center, Lenox Dale	At-grade intersection
Community of Lenox	25.565	41.143	Northern end of limited-access section	
Community of Lenox	25.565	41.143	Route 7A south to Route 183 – Historic Lenox	Northern terminus of Route 7A; former routing of US 7
Pittsfield	30.814	49.590	US 20 west – Albany, NY	Northern end of US 20 concurrency
Pittsfield	31.004	49.896	Route 9 west to US 20 west	Southern end of Route 9 concurrency
Pittsfield	31.157	50.142	Route 9 east – Dalton, Northampton	Northern end of Route 9 concurrency
Lanesborough	34.77	55.96	To Route 8	Access via US 7–Route 8 Connector Road
Town of Williamstown	47.205	75.969	Route 43 – Williamstown, Hancock, Stephentown, NY	
Town of Williamstown	49.084	78.993	Route 2 west – Troy, NY	Southern end of Route 2 concurrency
Community of Williamstown	51.405	82.728	Route 2 east – North Adams	Northern end of Route 2 concurrency
Town of Williamstown	52.572	84.606	Hoosic River	
Town of Williamstown	53.85	86.66	US 7 north – Pownal	Continuation into Vermont
1.000 mi = 1.609 km; 1.000 km = 0.621 mi: Concurrency terminus

== See also ==
U.S. Route 7
Previous state: Connecticut	Massachusetts	Next state: Vermont
