= Massachusetts Route 23 =

East-west state highway in Massachusetts, US

Route 23
- Route 23 highlighted in red

Route information
- Maintained by MassDOT
- Length: 38.429 mi (61.845 km)

Major junctions
- West end: NY 23 at the New York state line near Hillsdale, NY
- US 7 / Route 183 in Great Barrington; Route 57 in Monterey; Route 8 in Otis
- East end: US 20 in Russell

Location
- Country: United States
- State: Massachusetts
- Counties: Berkshire, Hampden

Highway system
- Massachusetts State Highway System; Interstate; US; State
← Route 22	→ Route 24

Route 23 is an east–west route in the western Massachusetts counties of Berkshire and Hampden. The entire route is 38.43 miles (61.85 km). Most of the road, approximately 31.2 miles (50.2 km), follows the Knox Trail, the historic route of General Henry Knox took to bring cannon from Fort Ticonderoga on Lake Champlain in New York to aid in ending the Siege of Boston in the winter of 1775–76. Prior to 1939, Route 23 was numbered as Route 17, which extended from Great Barrington to the New York state line.

== Route description ==
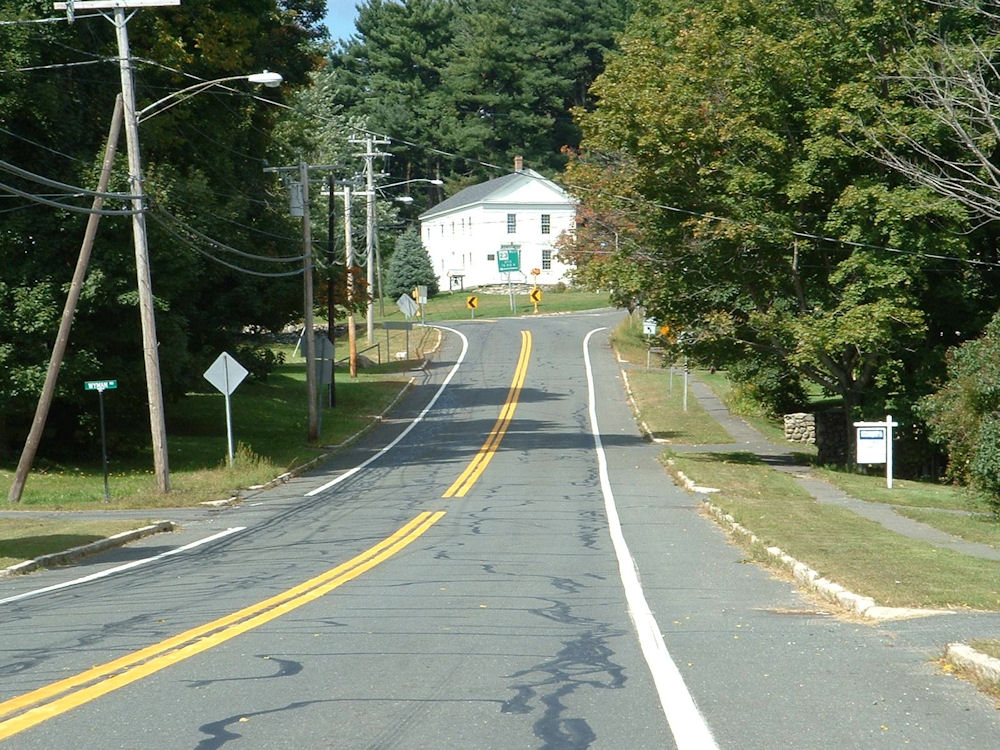
Looking westbound along Route 23 in Blandford

Route 23 begins at the New York state border at Egremont, Massachusetts, as a continuation of New York State Route 23 from Hillsdale. The road passes Catamount Ski Area and the village of South Egremont before merging with Route 41, just west of Great Barrington. It passes the Egremont Country Club and the Great Barrington Airport before passing the eastern terminus of Route 71. At this point the road becomes the Knox Trail. From there the road heads towards the town center, merging with U.S. Route 7, following that road for one mile (1.6 km) before leaving Route 41, with Routes 7 and 23 turning eastward, crossing the Housatonic River. After another half-mile, U.S. Route 7 heads northward, leaving Route 23 to head eastward, this time combined with Route 183. (There is a Knox Trail marker at this point.) The two pass Butternut Basin Ski Area before crossing the Appalachian Trail and entering Monterey. Just east of the line, Route 183 heads south at the western terminus of Route 57, leaving Route 23 alone. From there, the road passes through Monterey, running parallel to and eventually crossing the Konkapot River near the center of town. The road passes Lake Garfield and Chestnut Hill before crossing into Otis. The road crosses through a section of Otis State Forest and passes the Otis Ridge Ski Area before merging for a short time with Route 8 through the town's center. From there, the road heads eastward again, passing between Big Pond, Benton Pond and the Otis Reservoir (this area is also the site of another Knox Trail marker) towards the Hampden County line and the town of Blandford. Once in Blandford, the road heads due east, passing Miller Swamp, Jackson Hill and Blair Pond before entering the town's center, at which point the road begins to runs parallel to the south of Interstate 90 (the Massachusetts Turnpike). Route 23 enters Russell, heading south of Punchbowl Mountain. The Knox Trail leaves the route at Knox Mountain Road, and the route crosses an overpass over the interstate before finally ending 1.1 miles (1.8 km) east at the junction of U.S. Route 20 near the town's center.

== Major intersections ==
County	Location	mi	km	Destinations	Notes
Berkshire	Egremont	0.00	0.00	NY 23 west – Hillsdale	Continuation into New York
Berkshire	Egremont	3.40	5.47	Route 41 south – Salisbury, CT	Western end of Route 41 concurrency
Berkshire	Egremont	4.11	6.61	To Route 71 west – North Egremont	Access via Creamery Road
Berkshire	Town of Great Barrington	5.64	9.08	Route 71 west – North Egremont	Eastern terminus of Route 71
Berkshire	Community of Great Barrington	7.13	11.47	US 7 south – Sheffield, Canaan, CT	Roundabout; western end of US 7 concurrency
Berkshire	Community of Great Barrington	8.07	12.99	Route 41 north – West Stockbridge	Eastern end of Route 41 concurrency
Berkshire	Community of Great Barrington	8.86	14.26	US 7 north / Route 183 north – Stockbridge	Eastern end of US 7 concurrency; western end of Route 183 concurrency
Berkshire	Monterey	12.09	19.46	Route 57 east / Route 183 south – New Marlborough, Sandisfield	Eastern end of Route 183 concurrency; western terminus of Route 57
Berkshire	Otis	23.42	37.69	Route 8 north to US 20 – Becket	Western end of Route 8 concurrency
Berkshire	Otis	23.51	37.84	Route 8 south – Winsted, CT	Eastern end of Route 8 concurrency
Hampden	Russell	38.43	61.85	US 20 to Route 112 – Westfield, Springfield, Lee	Eastern terminus
1.000 mi = 1.609 km; 1.000 km = 0.621 mi: Concurrency terminus

== Gallery ==
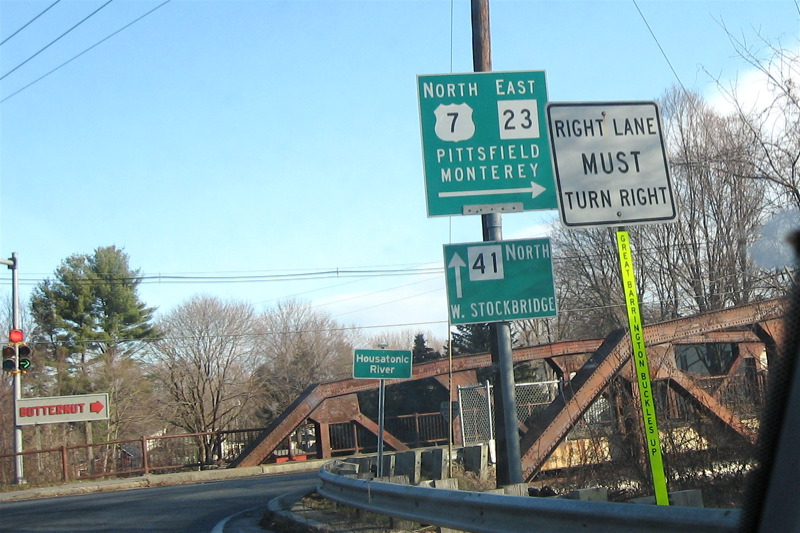
Route 23 and US 7 leave Route 41 in Great Barrington.

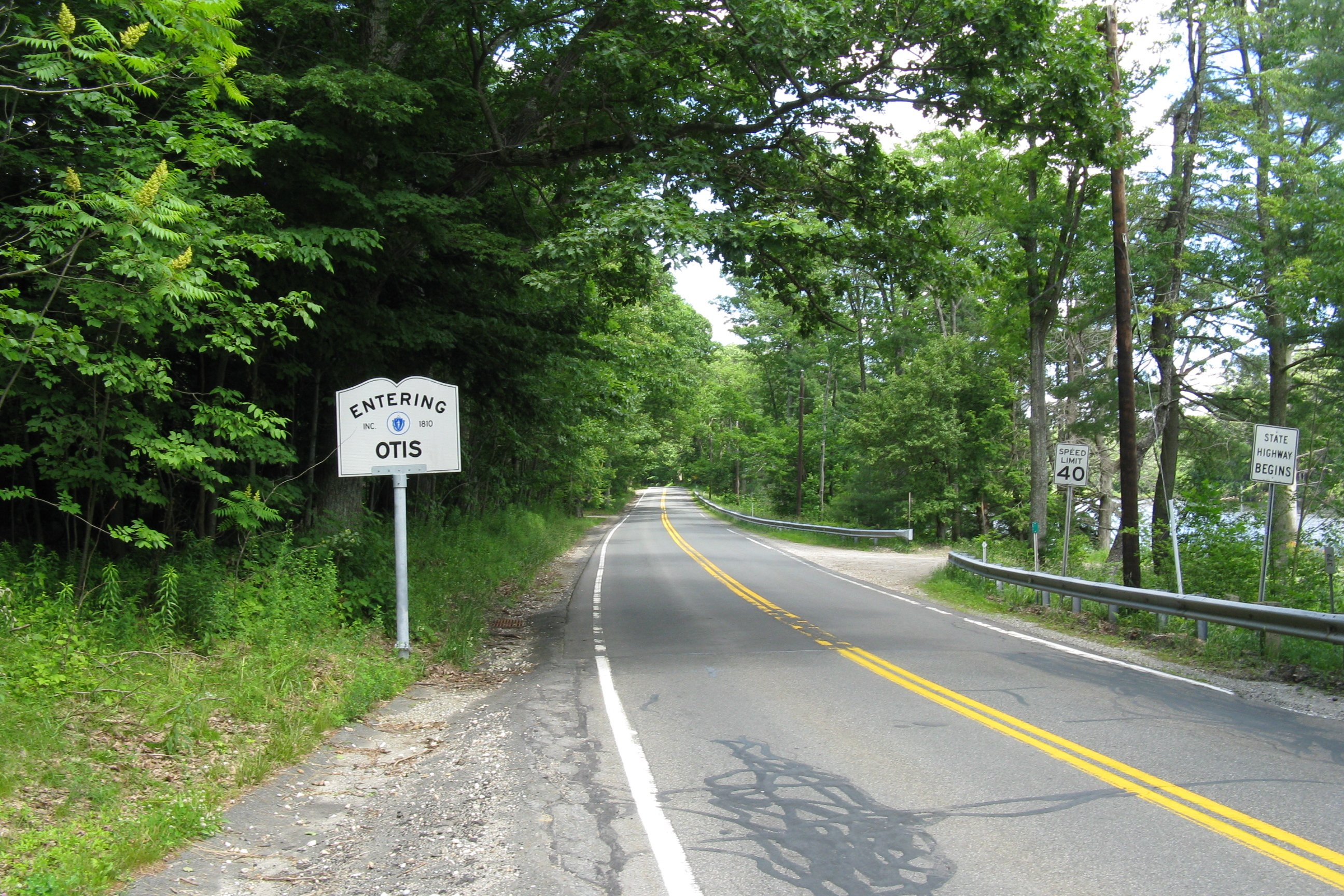
Route 23 enters Otis.

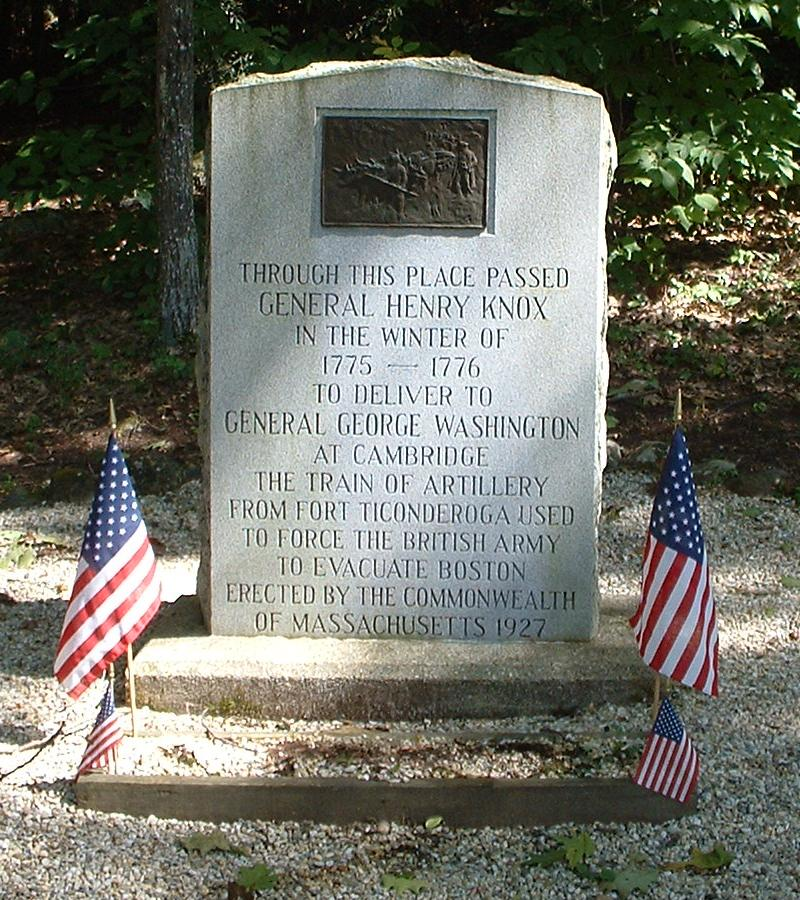
A Knox Trail stone along Route 23 in East Otis.
