= Massachusetts Route 183 =

State highway in Berkshire County, Massachusetts, US

Route 183
- Route 183 highlighted in red

Route information
- Maintained by MassDOT
- Length: 31.94 mi (51.40 km)

Major junctions
- South end: Route 183 at the Connecticut state line in Colebrook, CT
- US 7 / Route 23 in Great Barrington
- North end: US 7 / US 20 in Lenox

Location
- Country: United States
- State: Massachusetts
- Counties: Berkshire

Highway system
- Massachusetts State Highway System; Interstate; US; State
| ← Route 181 | → Route 186 |

Massachusetts Route 183 (MA 183) is a 31.94-mile-long (51.40 km) north–south state highway in Berkshire County, Massachusetts. The entire route travels from a continuation of Connecticut Route 183 by Colebrook, Connecticut, to U.S. Route 7 (US 7) and US 20 in Lenox.

== Route description ==
Route 183 begins at the Connecticut state line in Colebrook, Connecticut, as a northern continuation of that state's Route 183. Massachusetts's Route 183 runs northwest through the town of Sandisfield as Sandy Brook Road. The route runs northwest through the wooded sections of Sandisfield, soon crossing into the town of New Marlborough, changing monikers to New Marlborough Road. Reaching downtown New Marlborough, Route 183 intersects with Route 57 (New Marlborough Sandisfield Center Road).

Route 183 and Route 57 become concurrent through downtown New Marlborough, changing names to Hartsville New Marlborough Road. After downtown, the two routes meander to the northwest as a two-lane rural road through Berkshire County, reaching the village of Hartsville. Route 183 and Route 57 crosses into the town of Monterey and parallel the shores of Lake Buel. Now known as Pixley Road, the routes reach a junction with Route 23 (Main Road).

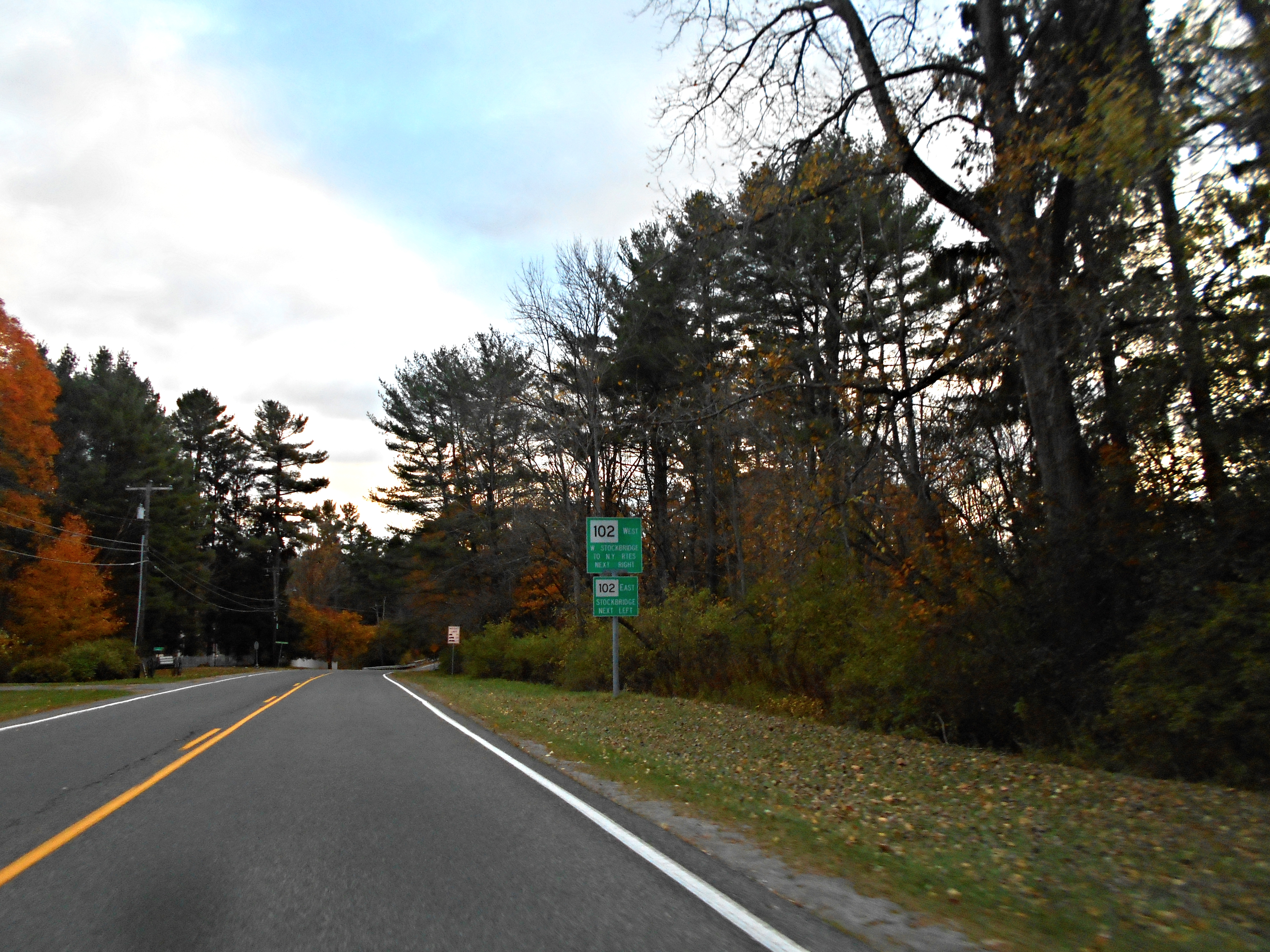
Route 183 south approaching the junction with Route 102 in Stockbridge

Route 57 terminates while Route 183 joins Route 23 along Monterey Road, running westward before changing names to State Road. Entering the town of Great Barrington, Route 23 turns southwest into downtown while Route 183 runs north onto a concurrency with U.S. Route 7 (US 7) along Stockbridge Road. Route 183 and US 7 run north along the winding Housatonic River. At the junction with Old Stockbridge Road, Route 183 forks to the northwest from US 7.

Route 183 soon changes names to Park Street, entering the village of Risingdale. In Risingdale, Route 183 turns north along the shoreline of the Housatonic. After a voyage along the riverside, the route crosses the Housatonic and enters the village of Housatonic. Now on the western shore of the river, Route 183 runs north along the riverside on Front Street along tracks owned by the Housatonic Railroad. Crossing into the town of Stockbridge, Route 183 begins winding eastward along the riverside for several miles.

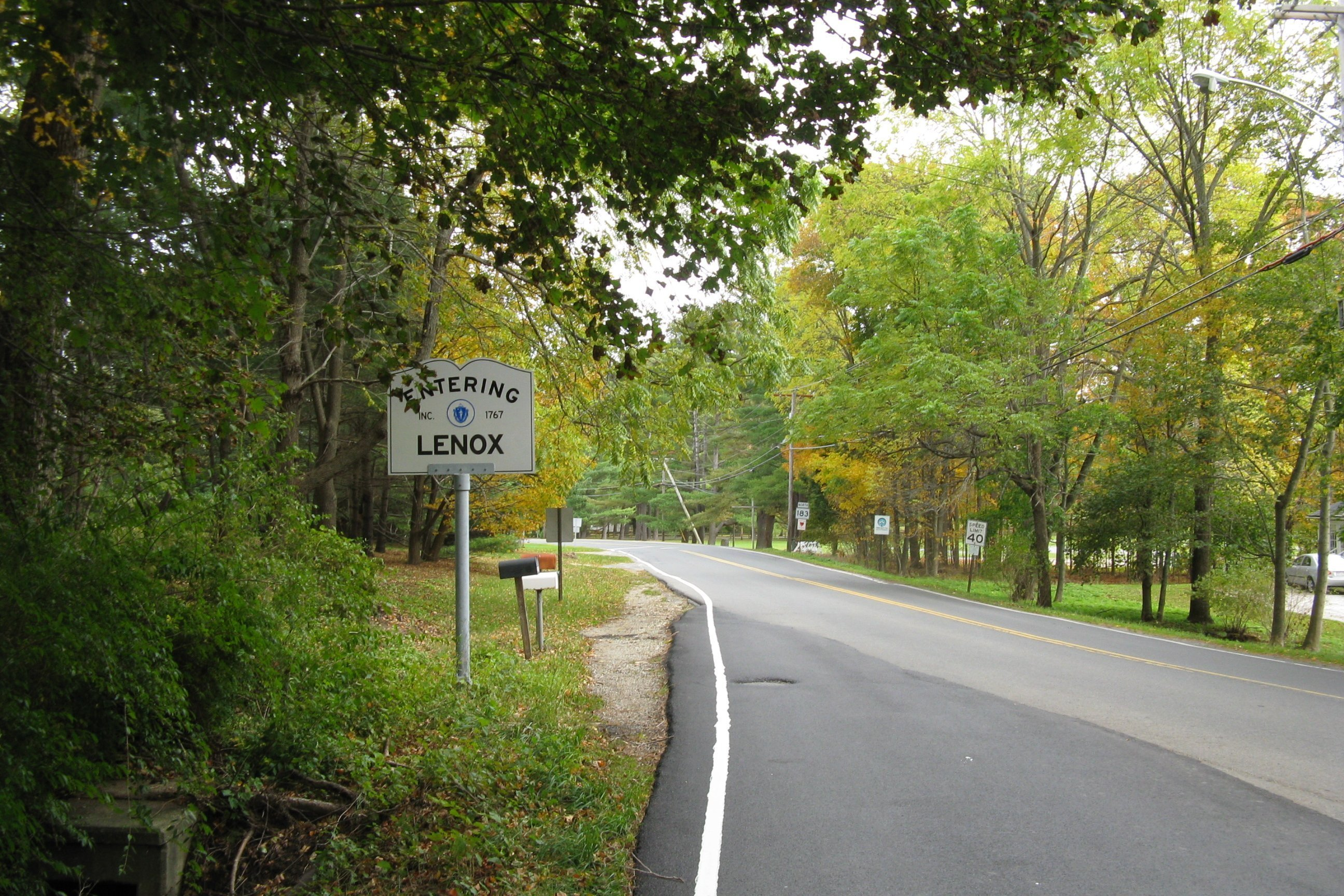
Northbound Route 183 entering Lenox

At Butler Road, the river bends southeast while Route 183 continues northeast through Stockbridge, crossing a junction with Route 102 (West Stockbridge Road). A short distance north, the route crosses under the Mass Pike (I-90) and enters the community of Interlaken. Route 183 wanders north through Stockbridge before entering the town of Lenox, where it gains the name of West Street. Running into downtown Lenox, Route 183 reaches a junction with Route 7A (Main Street).

Route 183 and Route 7A become concurrent through downtown Lenox along Walker Street, but it is short lived as Route 7A forks to the southeast less than a mile later. Route 183 continues east along Walker Street out of downtown Lenox and into an intersection with US 7 and US 20, which connect to Pittsfield.

== Major intersections ==
The entire route is in Berkshire County.

| Location | mi | km | Destinations | Notes |
|---|---|---|---|---|
| Sandisfield | 0.000 | 0.000 | Route 183 south – Colebrook | Continuation into Connecticut |
| New Marlborough | 7.353 | 11.834 | Route 57 east | Southern end of Route 57 concurrency |
| Monterey | 13.368 | 21.514 | Route 23 east – Monterey Route 57 ends | Southern end of Route 23 concurrency; western terminus of Route 57 |
| Community of Great Barrington | 16.849 | 27.116 | US 7 south / Route 23 west – Egremont, Sheffield | Northern end of Route 23 concurrency; southern end of US 7 concurrency |
| Town of Great Barrington | 18.243 | 29.359 | US 7 north – Stockbridge | Northern end of US 7 concurrency |
| Town of Great Barrington | 21.160 | 34.054 | Housatonic River | |
| Stockbridge | 25.332 | 40.768 | Route 102 – West Stockbridge, Lee | |
| Community of Lenox | 30.888 | 49.709 | Route 7A north – Pittsfield, Williamstown | Southern end of Route 7A concurrency; former US 7 north |
| Community of Lenox | 31.068 | 49.999 | Route 7A south – Stockbridge | Northern end of Route 7A concurrency; former US 7 south |
| Community of Lenox | 31.915 | 51.362 | US 7 / US 20 to Mass Pike (I-90 Toll) – Stockbridge, Lee | Northern terminus |
1.000 mi = 1.609 km; 1.000 km = 0.621 mi: Concurrency terminus
