= U.S. Route 7 =

Highway in the United States

U.S. Route 7
- US 7 highlighted in red

Route information
- Length: 308.36 mi (496.26 km)
- Existed: 1926–present

Major junctions
- South end: I-95 in Norwalk, CT
- US 1 in Norwalk, CT; I-84 / US 6 / US 202 in Danbury, CT; US 202 in New Milford, CT; US 44 in North Canaan, CT; US 20 in Pittsfield, MA; US 4 in Rutland, VT; I-189 in South Burlington, VT; US 2 in Burlington and Colchester, VT
- North end: I-89 near Highgate Springs, VT

Location
- Country: United States
- States: Connecticut, Massachusetts, Vermont

Highway system
- United States Numbered Highway System; List; Special; Divided
← US 6	US	→ US 8
← US 6	CT	→ Route 8
← Route 6A	MA	→ Route 7A
← VT 5A	VT	→ VT 7A
← Route 3	N.E.	→ Route 5

U.S. Route 7 (US 7) is a north–south United States Numbered Highway in western New England that runs for 308 miles (496 km) through Connecticut, Massachusetts, and Vermont. The highway's southern terminus is at Interstate 95 (I-95) exit 15 in Norwalk, Connecticut. Its northern terminus is at I-89 exit 22 near the village of Highgate Springs, Vermont, immediately south of the Canada–United States border.

== Route description ==
Lengths
	mi	km
CT	78.22	125.88
MA	53.85	86.66
VT	176.29	283.71
Total	308.36	496.26

=== Connecticut ===
US 7 in Connecticut (also known as Route 7, Ethan Allen Highway, and Super 7) is mostly a surface road but has two short expressway sections in the Norwalk and Danbury areas. US 7 begins in Norwalk with a four-mile (6.4 km) expressway to nearly the Wilton town line. There are three exits on this short section, signed as "The Forty Third Infantry Division Memorial Highway", named after the 43rd Infantry Division. Exit 1, just past I-95 (the southern terminus), leads to the Central Norwalk Business District and US 1. Exit 2 leads to Route 123 which extends from US 1 in Norwalk to the New York state line, passing through the town of New Canaan. After exit 2, the expressway reduces to four lanes from six. Exit 3 leads to Route 15 southbound, also known as the Merritt Parkway. This interchange was half built and only allows southbound access from the expressway; northbound access is gained via Route 123 at exit 2. The expressway section ends at Grist Mill Road in Norwalk, about one-half mile (0.80 km) past exit 3. US 7 then passes through Wilton as a four-lane highway until just after Cannondale, where it becomes a two-lane highway. It continues through Ridgefield as a two-lane highway.

Near Danbury, another expressway section was built beginning one mile (1.6 km) south of I-84 near Danbury Municipal Airport. This section is also signed as "The Forty Third Infantry Division Memorial Highway". Through Danbury proper, US 7 overlaps with I-84 for about four miles (6.4 km). Through this section of expressway, I-84, US 7, US 6, and US 202 are concurrent. US 7 and Route 202 then leave I-84 at exit 7 and travel on their own expressway for approximately eight miles (13 km) to just south of the New Milford town line. On this section there are two exits. At exit 11 (Federal Road), US 202 exits the expressway and at exit 12, US 202 crosses back over US 7. On southbound US 7, the exit for I-84 eastbound is signed as exit 10. There is no exit number for I-84 west because of the concurrency. The US 7 expressway then bypasses Brookfield to the west and terminates at an intersection with US 202 at the Fairfield–Litchfield county line. Construction on the section between I-84 and exit 12 began in 1974 and completed in 1976. The Brookfield bypass segment between exit 12 and the current expressway terminus opened in November 2009, after two years of construction. The former US 7 route through Brookfield is now signed solely as US 202.

US 7 is cosigned with US 202 until central New Milford, where US 202 turns east with Route 67 while US 7 continues north. Recent construction has also made large parts of US 7 between the terminus of the expressway and New Milford a four-lane divided highway with at-grade intersections. North of New Milford center, US 7 remains a two-lane road through the rest of Connecticut and leaves Connecticut in the town of North Canaan.

=== Massachusetts ===
US 7 enters Massachusetts in the town of Sheffield and remains a two-lane road until Lenox. There, a four-lane bypass of Lenox was built in two pieces, and the old US 7 is now Route 7A. US 7 continues on as a four-lane road to Pittsfield, where it is then a three-lane road, narrowing to two lanes for a short time, then widening to four lanes in downtown Pittsfield. US 7 leaves downtown Pittsfield as a two-lane surface arterial and continues as a rural highway with occasional three-lane stretches for climbing the grades along the Berkshires. It passes west of Mount Greylock before passing through Williamstown, connecting the Taconic Trail with the Mohawk Trail. The road passes Williams College before entering Vermont.

Like Connecticut, Massachusetts planned a US 7 expressway from the existing bypass in Lenox all the way to Lanesborough. This plan was never initiated, although land takings occurred. The highway was ultimately canceled due to environmental and community opposition.

In Massachusetts, US 7 passes through the towns of Sheffield, Great Barrington, Stockbridge, Lee, Lenox, Pittsfield, Lanesborough, New Ashford, and Williamstown, before crossing into Pownal, Vermont.

=== Vermont ===
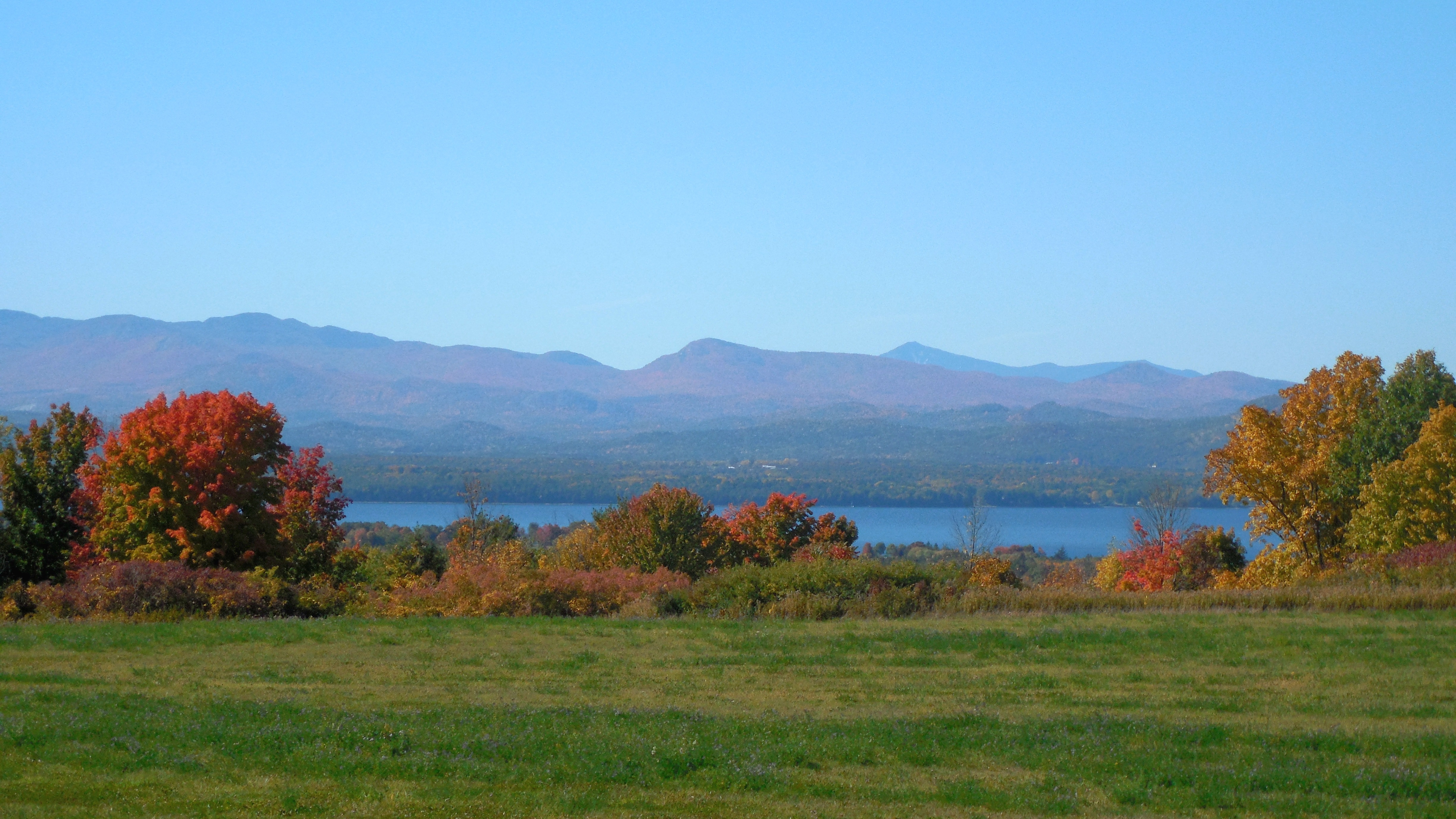
Westward view of Lake Champlain from US 7 in Charlotte

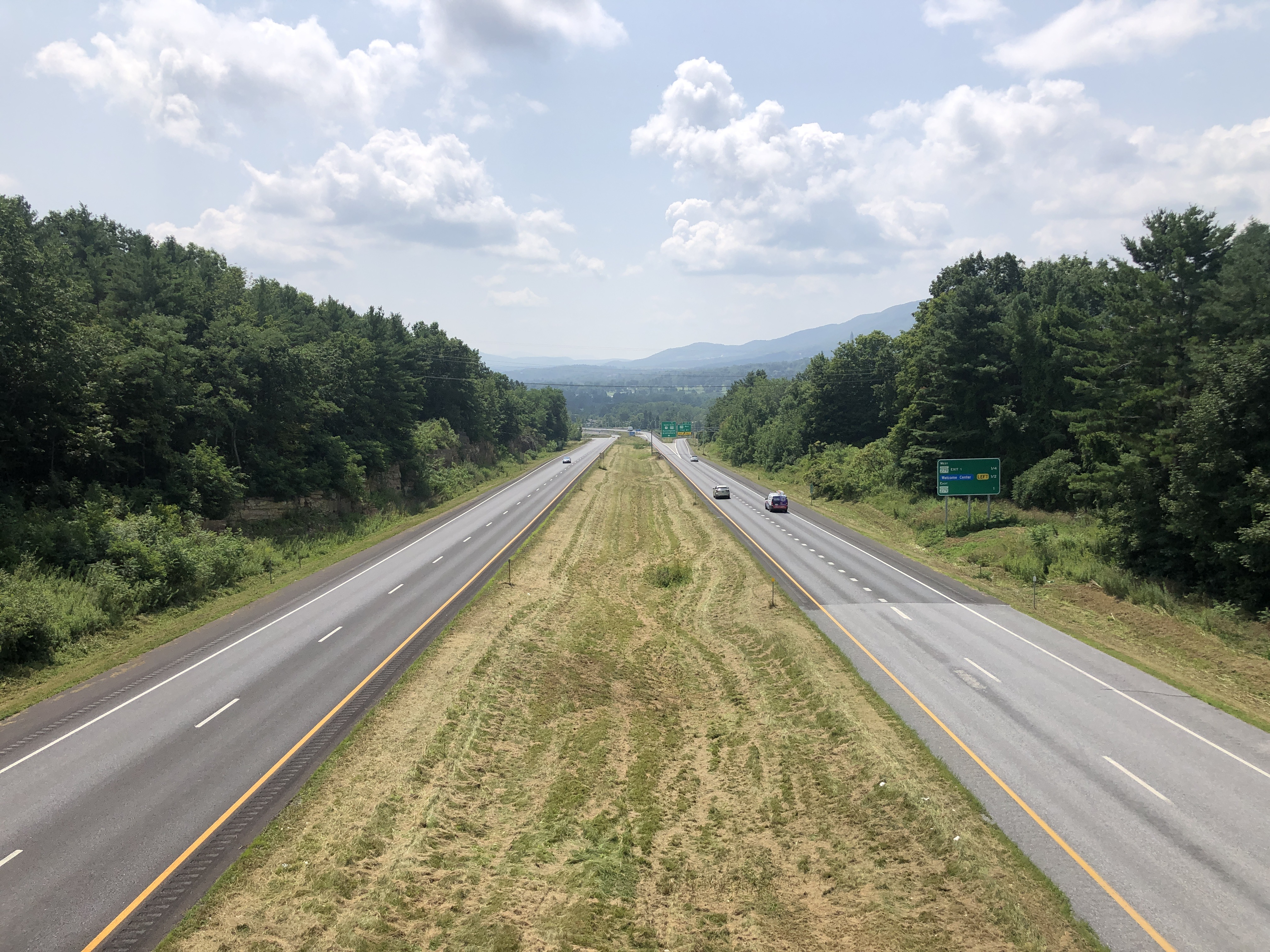
US 7 southbound in Bennington

US 7 remains a rural two-lane highway from the Massachusetts line to Bennington, where it becomes a grade separated freeway a mile (1.6 km) north of Bennington. Once complete, US 7 will utilize this new bypass, while the existing two-lane road into town will become part of Vermont Route 7A (VT 7A). North of town, the highway then again returns to expressway status. For three miles (4.8 km), it is a four-lane freeway with a grass median. US 7 then narrows down to an undivided two-lane freeway, with brief passing lanes in each direction. Just north of Manchester, the expressway ends. From Manchester to Wallingford, the road is two lanes and rural. North of Wallingford, US 7 becomes a four-lane divided highway with at-grade intersections, until its southern junction with US 4, south of the city of Rutland. From Rutland north, the road is either two-lane or four-lane undivided, uncontrolled road all the way to the Canada–United States border, except between Shelburne and Burlington, which is a four-lane divided highway. US 7 and US 2 run concurrently from Burlington to Chimney Corners in Colchester. It is known as the Ethan Allen Highway for much of the path through Vermont.

In Vermont, it passes through the towns of Pownal, Bennington, Shaftsbury, Glastenbury, Arlington, Sunderland, Manchester, Dorset, Danby, Mount Tabor, Wallingford, Clarendon, and Rutland; the city of Rutland; the towns of Pittsford, Brandon, Leicester, Salisbury, Middlebury, New Haven, Waltham, Ferrisburg, Charlotte, and Shelburne; the cities of South Burlington (at which point I-89 begins to parallel it), Burlington, and Winooski; the towns of Colchester, Milton, Georgia, and St. Albans; the city of St. Albans; and the towns of Swanton and Highgate before ending at I-89 just south of the customs offices at the Canada–United States border.

== History ==

Prior to the U.S. Numbered Highway System, the alignment of US 7 from Great Barrington, Massachusetts, to the Canada–United States border north of Highgate Springs, Vermont, was part of the New England road marking system's Route 4. When first commissioned in 1927, US 7 ran along the entire length of Route 4, continuing south from Great Barrington along current Route 41. Route 41 continues into Connecticut up to the town of Sharon. Route 4 then went west along Route 343 to the New York state line, where the road continues along New York State Route 343 (NY 343) to Amenia. US 7 originally extended further south of Amenia all the way to New York City along NY 22 but was never signed within the city. By 1929, the southern terminus had been shifted to Norwalk, Connecticut. The previous designations of the new alignment south of Great Barrington were: Route 17 to North Canaan, State Highway 134 to New Milford, State Highway 128 to Danbury, Route 3 to Ridgefield, and State Highway 126 to Norwalk.

Until the 1970s, US 7 reached the Canada–United States border, with the road continuing as provincial route 7. US 7 was then cut back to the I-89 interchange mentioned above, with I-89 continuing to the Canada–US border and becoming Route 133.

== Major intersections ==
Connecticut
I-95 in Norwalk
US 1 in Norwalk
I-84 in Danbury. The highways travel concurrently through the city.
US 6 / US 202 in Danbury. US 6/US 7 travel concurrently through the city. US 7/US 202 travel concurrently to Brookfield.
US 202 in Brookfield
US 202 in Brookfield. The highways travel concurrently to New Milford.
US 44 in North Canaan. The highways travel concurrently through the town.
Massachusetts
US 20 in Lenox. The highways travel concurrently to Pittsfield.
Vermont
US 4 in the Town of Rutland. The highways travel concurrently to the City of Rutland.
I-189 on the South Burlington–Burlington city line
US 2 in Burlington. The highways travel concurrently to Colchester.
I-89 in Colchester
I-89 in Georgia
I-89 in Highgate

== See also ==
- New York State Route 22, parallels the state line on the New York side
- Connecticut Route 41 and Massachusetts Route 41
- State Route 343 (New York−Connecticut)
- Massachusetts Route 7A
- Vermont Route 7A
- Vermont Route 7B
- New England road marking system

=== Special routes ===
- U.S. Route 7 Alternate, an alternate route of US 7 through Burlington, Vermont
