= Massachusetts Route 102 =

State highway in Berkshire County, Massachusetts, US

Route 102
- Route 102 highlighted in red

Route information
- Maintained by MassDOT
- Length: 12.33 mi (19.84 km)
- Existed: by 1933–present
- History: Assigned ca. 1950 to current alignment

Major junctions
- West end: NY 980D at the New York state line in West Stockbridge
- I-90 Toll / Mass Pike / Route 41 in West Stockbridge; US 7 in Stockbridge
- East end: I-90 Toll / Mass Pike / US 20 in Lee

Location
- Country: United States
- State: Massachusetts
- Counties: Berkshire

Highway system
- Massachusetts State Highway System; Interstate; US; State
← Route 101	→ Route 103

Massachusetts Route 102 (MA 102) is a 12.33-mile-long (19.84 km) west–east state highway in western Massachusetts. Its western terminus is at the New York border where it connects to New York State Route 22 (NY 22) in Canaan, New York, and its eastern terminus is at the intersection U.S. Route 20 (US 20) and the Massachusetts Turnpike (Interstate 90) exit 10 in Lee. Along the way it intersects several major highways, including Route 41 in West Stockbridge and US 7 and Route 183 in Stockbridge.

== Route description ==
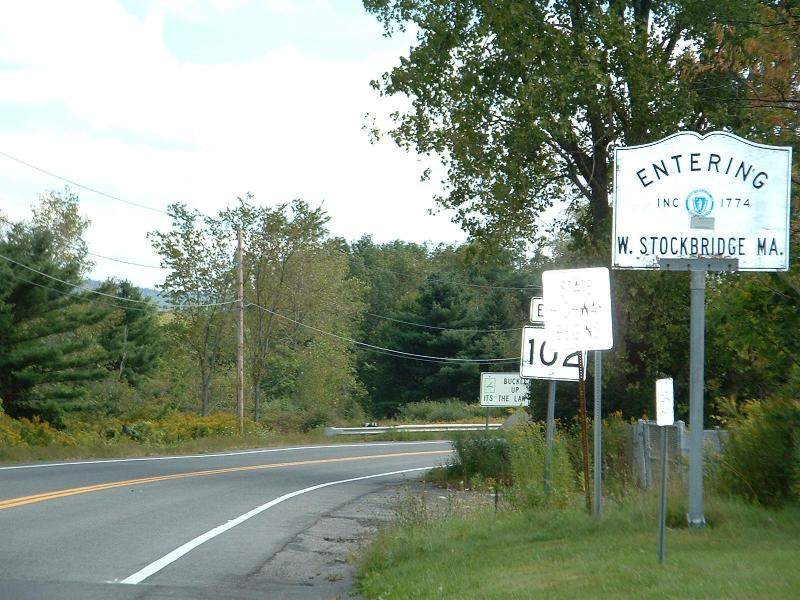
Western end of Route 102 at New York state line

Route 102 begins in West Stockbridge at the New York state line. It continues into Canaan, New York to meet New York State Route 22 (NY 22) via a 0.2-mile (0.32 km) connector road. The road, maintained by the New York State Department of Transportation, is designated NY 980D, an unsigned reference route.

The route crosses Interstate 90 (Massachusetts Turnpike) twice in its first two miles (3.2 km), where it is also known as State Line Road. It joins Route 41 for a one-half-mile (0.80 km) concurrency through the center of West Stockbridge, crossing the Williams River south of Shaker Mill Pond. The concurrency ends just north of exit 3 of the Mass Pike, which provides access to the eastbound turnpike and from the westbound turnpike.

Following this intersection, the route continues east into Stockbridge as West Stockbridge Road. It crosses the Mass Pike once more before intersecting Route 183 – which serves the Berkshire Botanical Garden and Norman Rockwell Museum – in the Larrywaug section of town.

The route passes through the center of the town by way of Church Street and Main Street, passing concurrently with U.S. Route 7 (US 7) for one-quarter mile (0.40 km). The route then continues eastward via Pleasant Street, traveling parallel to the Housatonic River as it continues into Lee. After an at-grade railroad crossing with the Berkshire Subdivision, the route turns to the northeast before meeting its eastern terminus at the junction of US 20 (Houstatonic Street) and the entrance ramps to exit 10 of the Mass Pike.

== Major intersections ==
The entire route is in Berkshire County.

Location	mi	km	Destinations	Notes
West Stockbridge	0.00	0.00	To NY 22 – Austerlitz, New Lebanon	Western terminus; New York state line; access via NY 980D
West Stockbridge	2.47	3.98	Route 41 north – Pittsfield	Western end of Route 41 concurrency
West Stockbridge	3.02	4.86	I-90 Toll east / Mass Pike east / Route 41 south – Great Barrington	Eastern end of Route 41 concurrency; exit 3 on I-90 / Mass Pike
Stockbridge	5.84	9.40	Route 183 – Lenox, Pittsfield, Great Barrington, Canaan	
Stockbridge	7.67	12.34	US 7 south – Great Barrington, Sheffield	Western end of US 7 concurrency
Stockbridge	8.07	12.99	US 7 north – Lenox, Pittsfield	Eastern end of US 7 concurrency
Lee	12.30	19.79	I-90 Toll / Mass Pike / US 20 – Albany, Springfield, Lee, Lenox, Pittsfield, Becket	Eastern terminus; exit 10 on I-90 / Mass Pike
1.000 mi = 1.609 km; 1.000 km = 0.621 mi: Concurrency terminus
