= Massachusetts Route 7A =

State highway in Berkshire County, Massachusetts, US

Route 7A

Route information
- Maintained by MassDOT
- Existed: ca. 1961–present

Southern segment
- Length: 2.98 mi (4.80 km)
- South end: SR 832 at the Connecticut state line in Ashley Falls
- North end: US 7 in Sheffield

Northern segment
- Length: 2.72 mi (4.38 km)
- South end: US 7 in Lenox
- Major intersections: Route 183 in Lenox
- North end: US 7 / US 20 in Lenox

Location
- Country: United States
- State: Massachusetts

Highway system
- Massachusetts State Highway System; Interstate; US; State
| ← US 7 | → Route 8 |

Massachusetts Route 7A (MA 7A) is a state highway and alternate to U.S. Route 7 (US 7) in Berkshire County, Massachusetts. It has two posted segments, with a total length of 5.83 miles (9.38 km). Between these segments, Route 7A is coextensive with US 7.

Both segments of Route 7A follow former alignments of US 7.

== Route description ==
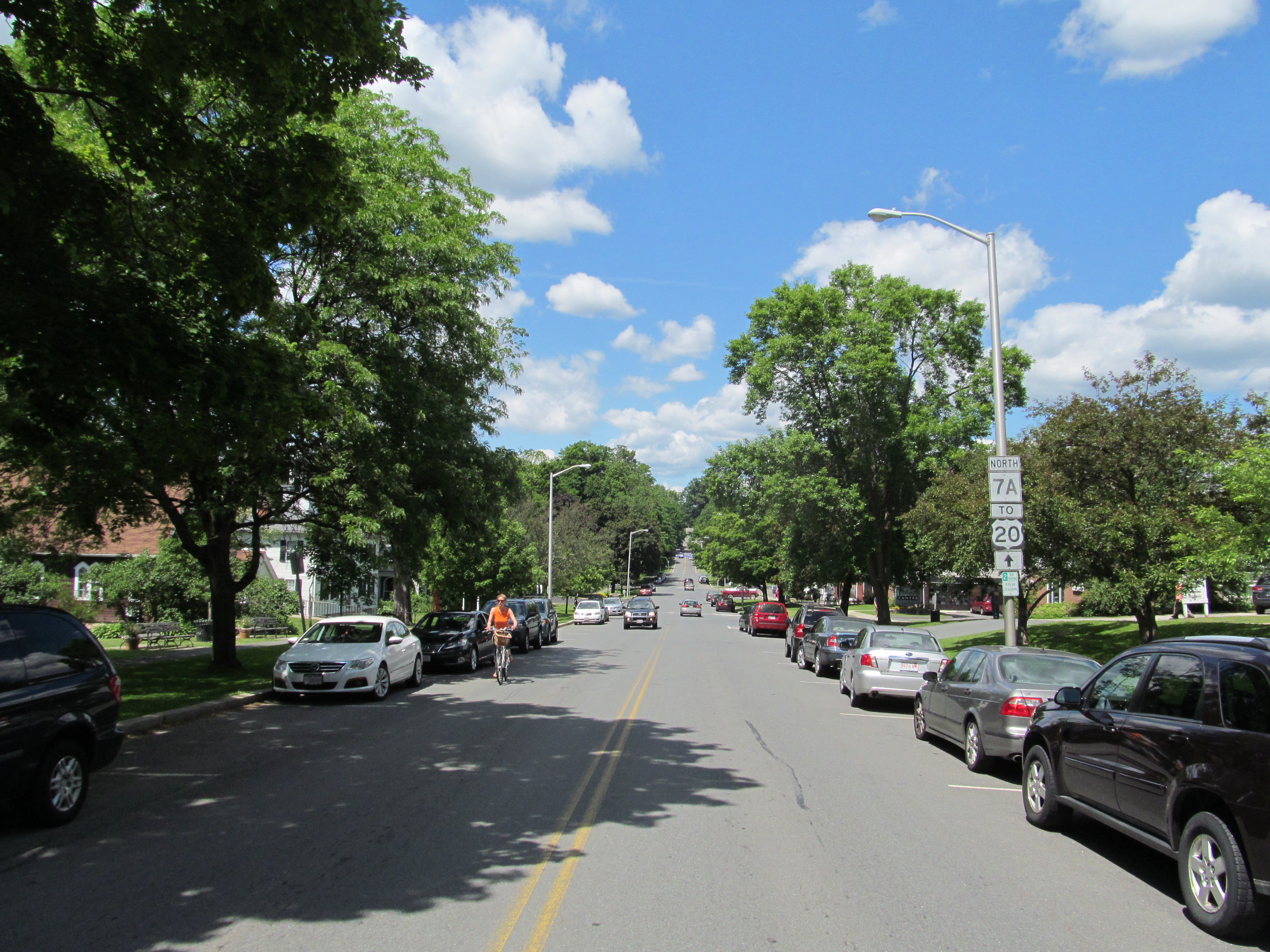
Looking northbound in Lenox Center

From its southern terminus to its northern one, Route 7A spans 25.3 miles (40.7 km). However, its "signed" sections only add up to approximately 5.6 miles (9.0 km), with the connection made via US 7.

=== Southern segment ===
The southern segment begins at the Connecticut border, where the unsigned Connecticut State Road 832 connects Route 7A to its parent route 0.3 miles (0.48 km) south in the town of North Canaan. Route 7A runs northward for nearly 3 miles (4.8 km) as Ashley Falls Road, passing through the village of Ashley Falls and crossing the Housatonic River before rejoining its parent route in the town of Sheffield.

=== Northern segment ===
About 19 miles (31 km) north by way of US 7, Route 7A's northern segment begins at an intersection with its parent route just south of a junction with U.S. Route 20 in the town of Lenox. It heads northward along Kemble Street, passing the site of Shakespeare & Company before meeting Route 183 (Walker Street) within the CDP of Lenox. The two routes continue north along Walker Street for a brief 0.2 miles (0.32 km) concurrency before Route 183 bears south towards Tanglewood. Route 7A continues northward through Lenox Village along Main Street, ending finally at its parent route approximately 1 mile (1.6 km) northward.

== History ==
The bypass routing of US 7 around Lenox Village, which gave way to the northern segment of Route 7A, was made as part of a failed attempt to make that route a freeway to Lanesborough.

== Major intersections ==
The entire route is in Berkshire County.

| Location | mi | km | Destinations | Notes |
|---|---|---|---|---|
| Ashley Falls | 0.00 | 0.00 | To US 7 – Canaan | Southern terminus; Connecticut state line; access via SR 832 |
| Sheffield | 2.98 | 4.80 | US 7 – Canaan, Danbury | Northern terminus |
see US 7 (mile 2.958–22.251)
| Town of Lenox | 22.58 | 36.34 | US 7 to US 20 – Stockbridge, Great Barrington, Pittsfield, Williamstown | Southern terminus |
| Community of Lenox | 23.96 | 38.56 | Route 183 north to US 7 / US 20 | Southern end of Route 183 concurrency |
| Community of Lenox | 24.11 | 38.80 | Route 183 south – Housatonic, Glendale, Tanglewood | Northern end of Route 183 concurrency |
| Community of Lenox | 25.30 | 40.72 | US 7 / US 20 – Pittsfield, Williamstown | Northern terminus |
1.000 mi = 1.609 km; 1.000 km = 0.621 mi: Concurrency terminus
