= Massachusetts Route 41 =

State highway in Berkshire County, Massachusetts, US

Route 41
- Route 41 highlighted in red

Route information
- Maintained by MassDOT
- Length: 31.1588 mi (50.1452 km)
- Existed: ca. 1932–present

Major junctions
- South end: Route 41 at the Connecticut state line near Salisbury, CT
- US 7 / Route 23 in Great Barrington; I-90 Toll / Mass Pike / Route 102 in West Stockbridge
- North end: US 20 in Pittsfield

Location
- Country: United States
- State: Massachusetts
- Counties: Berkshire

Highway system
- Massachusetts State Highway System; Interstate; US; State
← Route 40	→ Route 43

Route 41 is a 31.1588-mile-long (50.1452 km) extension of Connecticut Route 41 into Massachusetts. It begins at the Connecticut state line in Sheffield and ends at U.S. Route 20 (US 20) in Pittsfield. Route 41 was the original alignment for New England Interstate Route 4 south of Great Barrington before 1930.

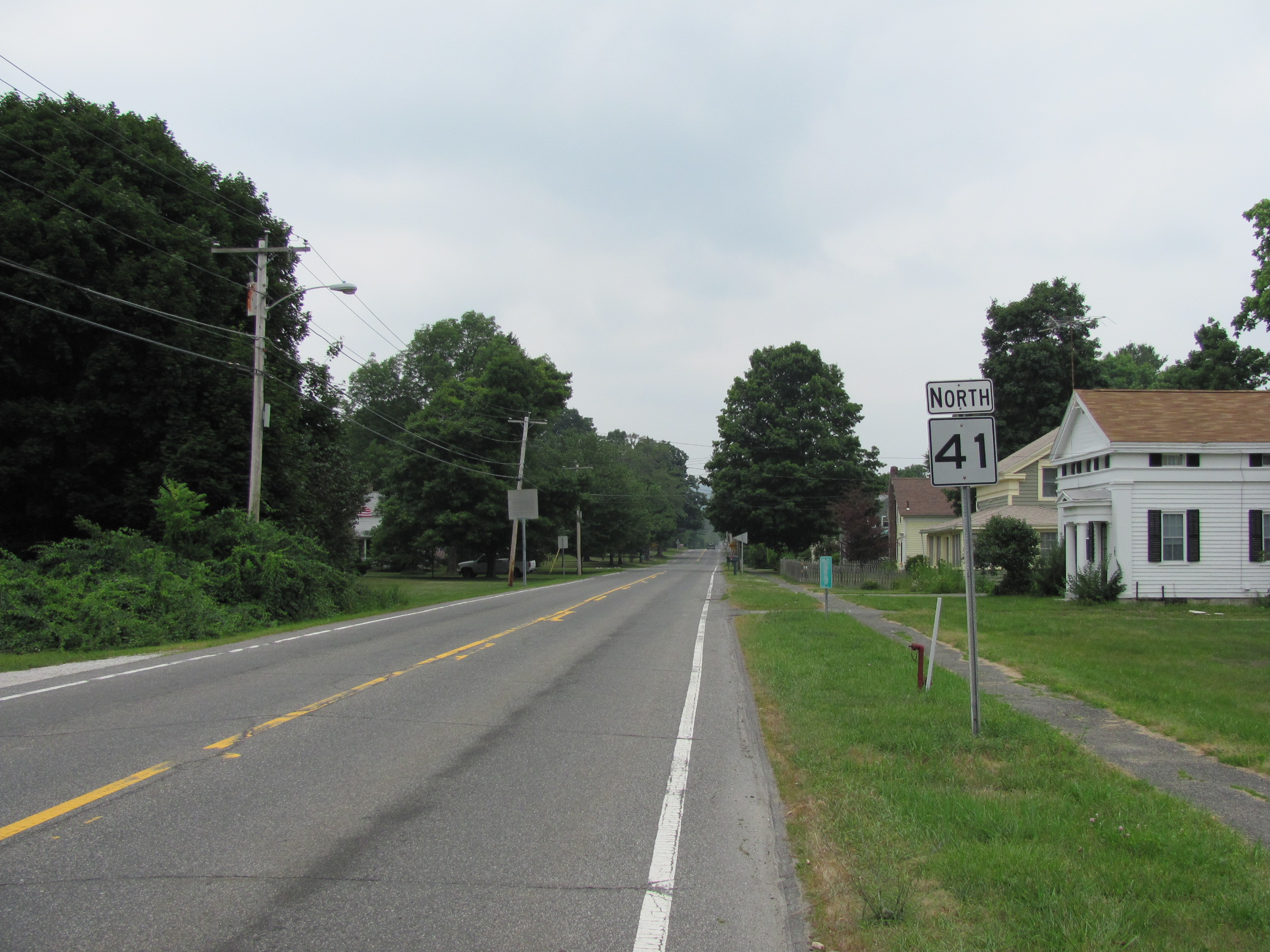
Northbound in West Stockbridge

== Route description ==
Massachusetts Route 41 begins in the southwest corner of Sheffield at the Connecticut state line, where it continues as Connecticut Route 41 into the town of Salisbury. It heads mostly northbound, east of Mount Everett and the southern Taconic mountain range. In neighboring Egremont, the road becomes concurrent with Route 23, turning northeastward into Great Barrington. In Great Barrington, it meets the eastern end of Route 71 before meeting U.S. Route 7 south of the town center. South of this point, U.S. Route 7 formerly followed the path of Route 41.

The three roads head through the town center concurrently, just east of the Housatonic River, before Route 41 leaves the concurrency just before the other two routes cross the river. Route 41 heads relatively northward into West Stockbridge, where it meets exit 3 of the Massachusetts Turnpike. Directly north of the Pike, Route 41 begins a short, 0.5 miles (0.80 km) concurrency with Route 102, passing Shaker Mill Pond before the routes split, with Route 41 heading northward into Richmond. In Richmond, it meets the end of Route 295, which leads shortly into New York. Route 41 ends north of the Richmond-Pittsfield line at U.S. Route 20, just east of the Hancock Shaker Village in Hancock and southwest of Pittsfield's airport and city center.

== Major intersections ==
The entire route is in Berkshire County.

Location	mi	km	Destinations	Notes
Sheffield	0.0	0.0	Route 41 south	Continuation into Connecticut
Egremont	7.9	12.7	Route 23 west – Hillsdale, NY	Southern end of Route 23 concurrency
Egremont	8.6	13.8	To Route 71 west – North Egremont	Access via Creamery Road
Town of Great Barrington	10.3	16.6	Route 71 west – North Egremont	Eastern terminus of Route 71
Community of Great Barrington	11.9	19.2	US 7 south – Sheffield, Canaan, CT	Roundabout; southern end of US 7 concurrency
Community of Great Barrington	12.8	20.6	US 7 north / Route 23 east – Pittsfield, Monterey	Northern end of US 7/Route 23 concurrency
West Stockbridge	22.2	35.7	I-90 Toll east / Mass Pike east – Springfield, Boston	Exit 3 on I-90 / Mass Pike
West Stockbridge	22.4	36.0	Route 102 east – Stockbridge	Southern end of Route 102 concurrency
West Stockbridge	22.9	36.9	Route 102 west to I-90 Toll west (Berkshire Connector) / NY 22	Northern end of Route 102 concurrency
Richmond	27.7	44.6	Route 295 west – Canaan, NY, Chatham, NY	Eastern terminus of Route 295
Pittsfield	31.2	50.2	US 20 to US 7 / Route 9 east – Pittsfield, Albany, NY	Northern terminus
1.000 mi = 1.609 km; 1.000 km = 0.621 mi: Concurrency terminus; Electronic toll collection; Incomplete access
