= MA8 =

MA-8 may refer to:

- Massachusetts's 8th congressional district
- Massachusetts Route 8
- Mercury-Atlas 8, a spaceflight of Project Mercury
