= TurnPark Art Space =

Open-air museum, sculpture park and performance space

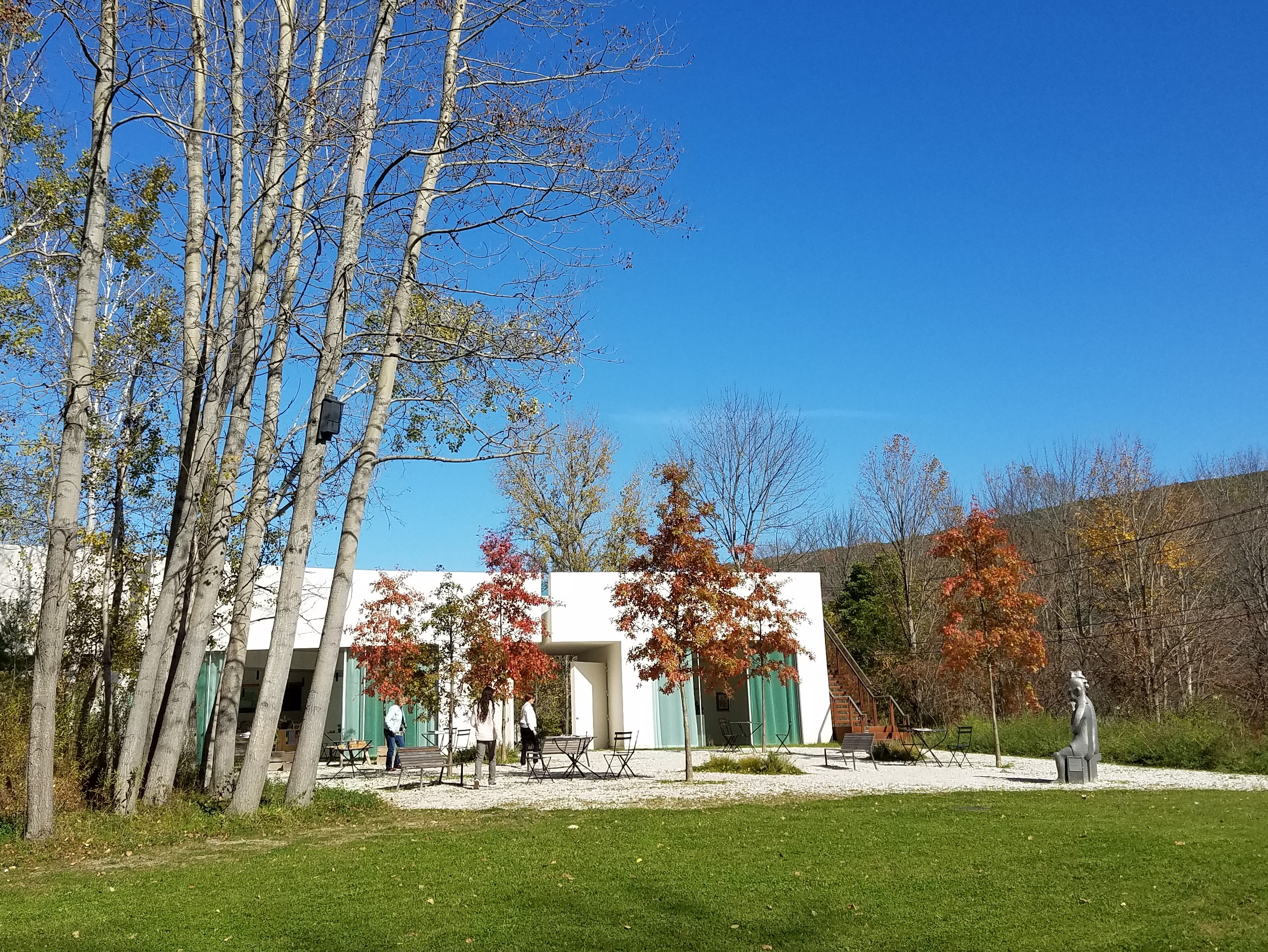

- Location of TurnPark in Massachusetts TurnPark Art Space (the United States)
- Established: May 14, 2017
- Location: 2 Moscow Road, West Stockbridge
- Coordinates: 42.333203°N 73.369314°W
- Website: https://www.turnpark.com/

TurnPark Art Space, is an open-air museum, sculpture park, and performance space located in West Stockbridge, Massachusetts. The approximately 16 acres (6.5 ha; 0.025 sq mi) site is located on the grounds of a former lime and marble quarry. It includes a collection of sculptures, mostly from the Soviet Nonconformist Art movement of the 1950s - 1980s, represented by Nikolai Silis, Vladimir Lemport and Nazar Bilyk. The Gate House contains a temporary exhibition space. A 2000-square foot art gallery is planned for the site. A small amphitheater is used for outdoor performances.

The park was established in May 2017 by collectors Igor Gomberg and Katya Brezgunova, and designed by architects Grigori Fateyev and Alexander Konstantinov
