= West Stockbridge Grange No. 246 =

- U.S. National Register of Historic Places
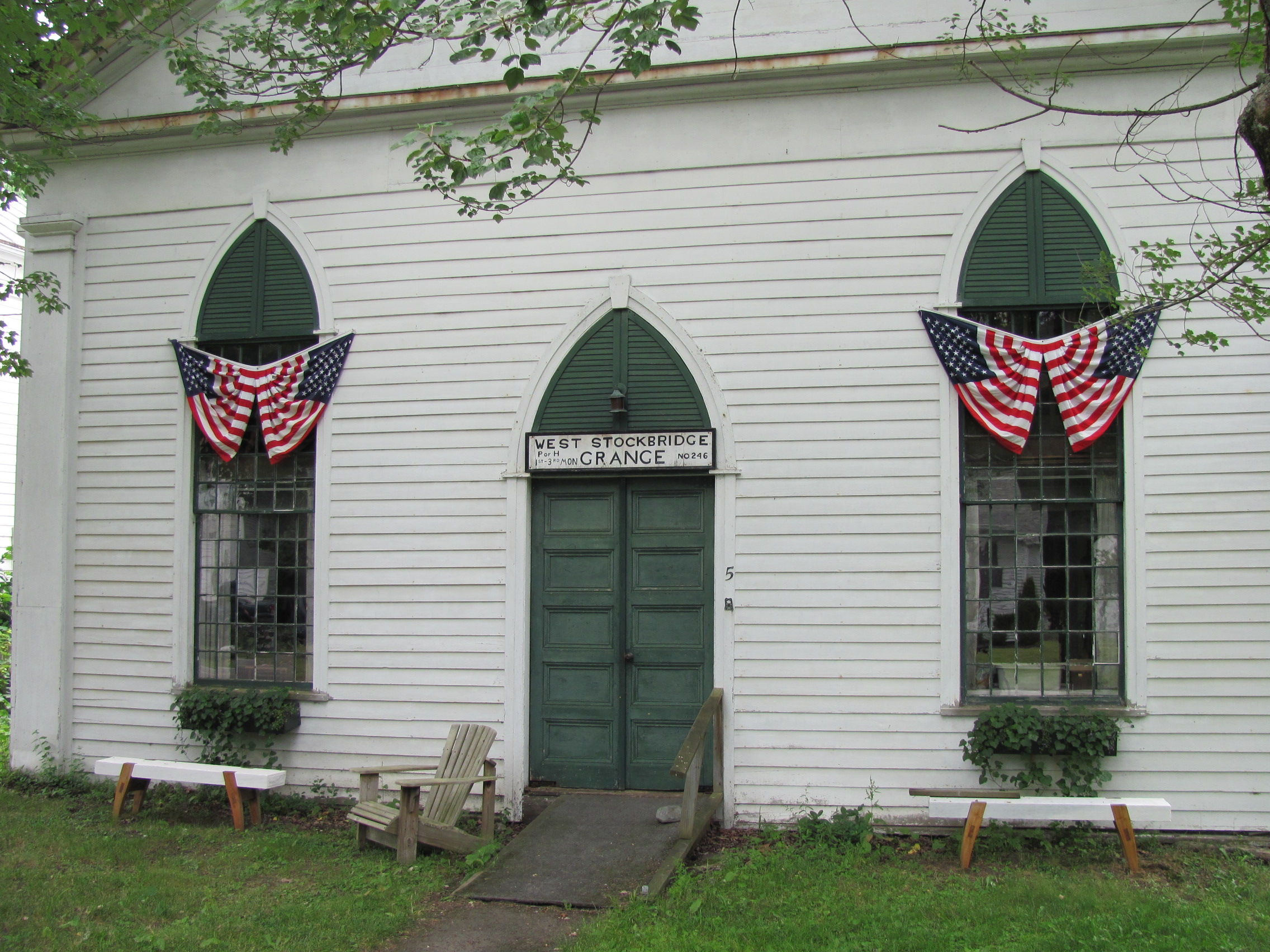
- West Stockbridge Grange No. 246

- Location within Massachusetts Location within the United States
- Location: West Stockbridge, Massachusetts
- Coordinates: 42°20′9″N 73°22′7″W
- Built: 1838
- Architectural style: Greek Revival
- NRHP reference No.: 99000134
- Added to NRHP: February 5, 1999

West Stockbridge Grange No. 246 is a historic grange hall at 5 Swamp Road in West Stockbridge, Massachusetts.

The Greek Revival building was constructed in 1838 and added to the National Register of Historic Places in 1999.

This early Grange Hall was originally built as the Methodist Church in the Village of West Stockbridge in 1838. Located on Swamp Road the property is bordered by the Williams River. A handsome example of Greek Revival architecture, which still retains its original 36 over 36 sashes with glazed gothic arches, the church closed in 1910. The building remained vacant for a number of years.

In 1918 the building was purchased by the West Stockbridge/Alford Grange and underwent extensive renovations to the interior making it one of the "best Grange Halls of its day in Western Massachusetts." These improvements included electricity, wainscoting the walls and vaulted ceiling, the installation of some of the original church pews on sidewall platforms, and the addition of rock maple flooring. The choir was also enclosed and glazed pocket doors with early stained glass decals were installed. A dramatic theatrical stage was constructed at the back of the large open meeting room with a spectacular hand-painted theater curtain which remains there today. The building was dedicated by members of that Grange on August 1, 1919, and the lofty 17’ ceiling, gothic windows, moldings, and wainscoting remain intact from this time period.

== See also ==
- National Register of Historic Places listings in Berkshire County, Massachusetts
