= Lenox, Massachusetts =

Town in the United States

Lenox
- Town
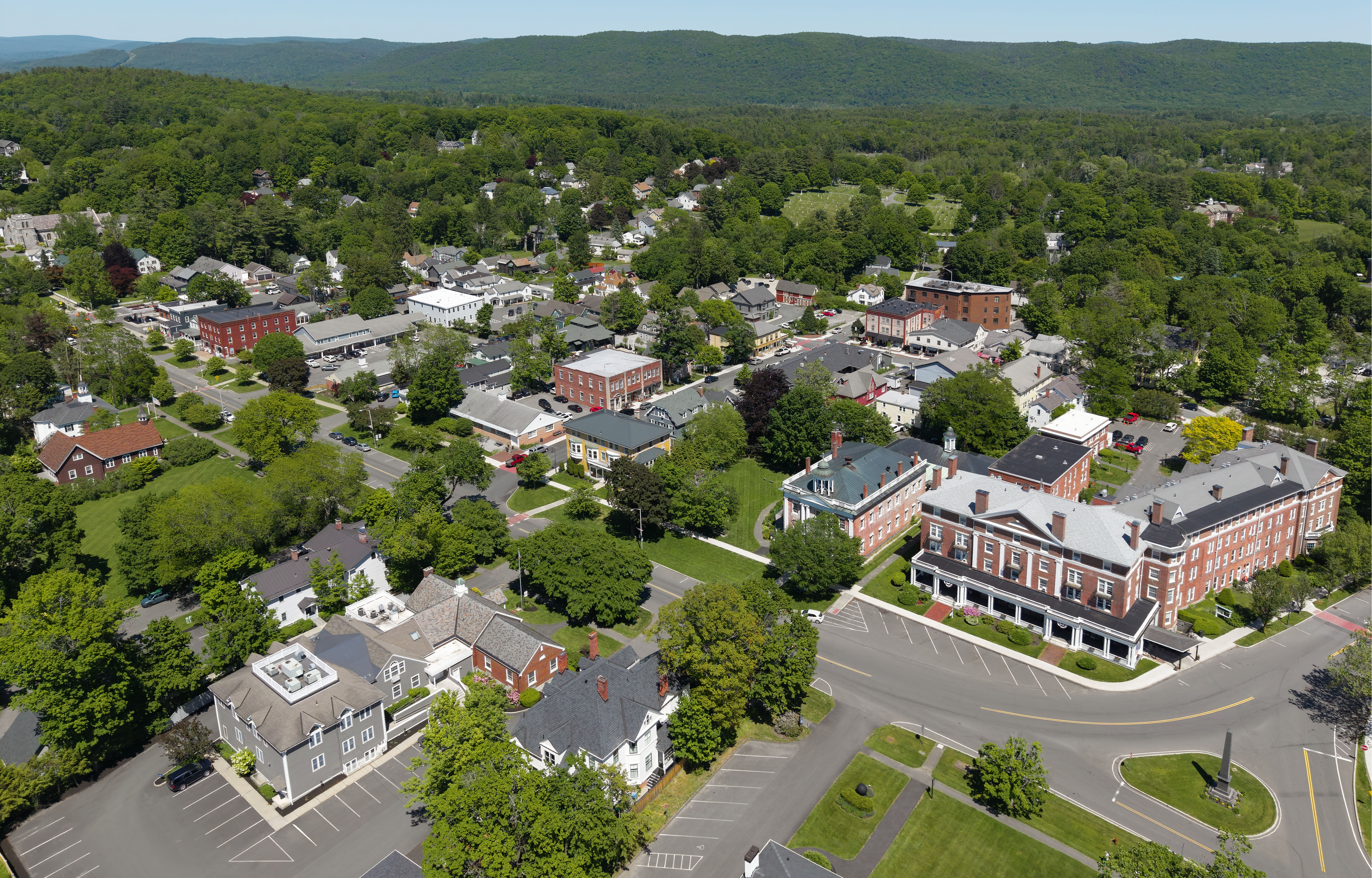
- Downtown (2026)

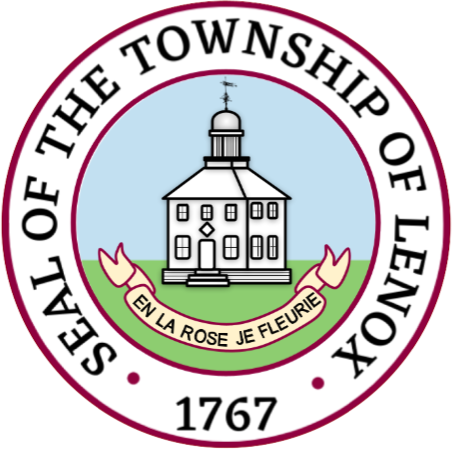
- Seal
- Motto(s): En La Rose, Je Fleurie (French) "In the Rose, I Flowered" (Flourished)
- Location in Berkshire County and the state of Massachusetts.
- Coordinates: 42°21′23″N 73°17′07″W
- Country: United States
- State: Massachusetts
- County: Berkshire
- Settled: 1750
- Incorporated: 1767

Government
  - Type: Open town meeting

Area
  - Total: 21.7 sq mi (56.1 km^{2})
  - Land: 21.2 sq mi (55.0 km^{2})
  - Water: 0.46 sq mi (1.2 km^{2})
- Elevation: 1,201 ft (366 m)

Population (2020)
  - Total: 5,095
  - Density: 240/sq mi (92.6/km^{2})
- Time zone: UTC-5 (Eastern)
  - Summer (DST): UTC-4 (Eastern)
- ZIP Codes: 01240 (Lenox); 01242 (Lenox Dale)
- Area code: 413
- FIPS code: 25-34970
- GNIS feature ID: 0618269
- Website: www.townoflenox.com

Lenox is a town in Berkshire County, Massachusetts, United States. The town is in Western Massachusetts and part of the Pittsfield Metropolitan Statistical Area. The population was 5,095 at the 2020 census. Lenox is the site of Shakespeare & Company and Tanglewood, summer home of the Boston Symphony Orchestra. Lenox includes the villages of New Lenox and Lenox Dale and the census-designated place of Lenox, and is a tourist destination during the summer.

== History ==
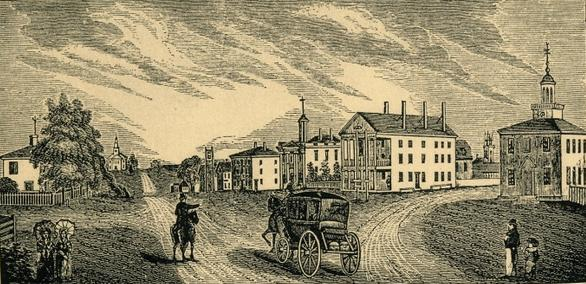
View of Lenox in 1839

The area was inhabited by Mahicans, Native American Algonquian speakers who largely lived along the Hudson and Housatonic Rivers. Hostilities during the French and Indian Wars discouraged settlement by European colonial settlers until 1750, when Jonathan and Sarah Hinsdale from Hartford, Connecticut, established a small inn and general store. The Province of Massachusetts Bay thereupon auctioned large tracts of land for 10 townships in Berkshire County, set off in 1761 from Hampshire County.

For 2,250 pounds Josiah Dean purchased Lot Number 8, which included present-day Lenox and Richmond. After conflicting land claims were resolved, it was deeded to Samuel Brown Jr., who had bought the land from the Mahican chief, on condition that he pay 650 pounds extra. It was founded as Richmond in 1765. But because the Berkshires divided the town in two, the village of Yokuntown (named for an indigenous chief) was set off as Lenox in 1767. The town was intended to be called Lennox, probably after Charles Lennox, 3rd Duke of Richmond and Lennox (Scottish Gaelic Leamhnachd), but the name was misspelled by a clerk at incorporation.

Early industries included farming, sawmills, textile mills, potash production, glassworks, and quarrying. A vein of iron ore led to the digging of mines under the town, and the establishment by Job Gilbert in the 1780s of an iron works at Lenox Dale, also known as Lenox Furnace. In 1784, Lenox became the county seat, which it remained until 1868 when the title passed to Pittsfield. The county courthouse built in 1816 is today the Lenox Library.

The region's rustic beauty helped Lenox develop into an art colony. In 1821, author Catharine Sedgwick moved here, followed by actress Fanny Kemble. Nathaniel Hawthorne and his family came from Salem in 1850, staying a year and a half. Other visitors to the area, including Timothy Dwight, Benjamin Silliman and Henry Ward Beecher, extolled its advantages. After an extension of the Housatonic Railroad arrived in 1838, tourists discovered the town in increasing numbers.

In 1844, Samuel Gray Ward of Boston, the American representative for Barings Bank of London, assembled tracts of land to create the first estate in Lenox. Called Highwood, the Italianate dwelling was designed in 1845 by Richard Upjohn. In 1876, Ward hired Charles F. McKim to design in the Shingle Style another property, Oakwood. The period from 1880 until 1920 would be dubbed the Berkshire Cottage era, when the small New England town was transformed into a Gilded Age resort similar to Newport, Rhode Island, and Bar Harbor, Maine. The wealthy and their entourage opened immense houses for recreation and entertaining during the Berkshire Season, which lasted from late summer until early fall. One event was the annual Tub Parade, when Main Street was lined with ornately decorated carriages. Property values jumped as millionaires competed for land on which to build showplaces. In 1903, an acre in Lenox cost $20,000, when an acre in nearby towns cost a few dollars.

The imposition of the federal income tax in 1913 ended construction of the country mansions in the Berkshires. The estates started to break up during the 1920s. Carnegie's widow sold Shadowbrook to the Jesuits for a seminary in 1922. The Depression made it harder to maintain the estates, and labor was scarce during World War II. After the war, some of the estates were torn or burned down. Others became schools or seminaries. Some estates became preparatory schools, although they would close by the 1970s and 1980s.

The Shadowbrook property is now the Kripalu yoga center; another, The Mount, is the former home of Shakespeare & Company. Some have been converted into vacation condominiums. Tanglewood, the former estate of the Tappan family which lies partially in Stockbridge, would in 1937 become summer home to the Boston Symphony Orchestra. Lenox remains a popular tourist destination. It was a filming location for Before and After (1996) and The Cider House Rules (1999), which was shot at Ventfort Hall Mansion and Gilded Age Museum.

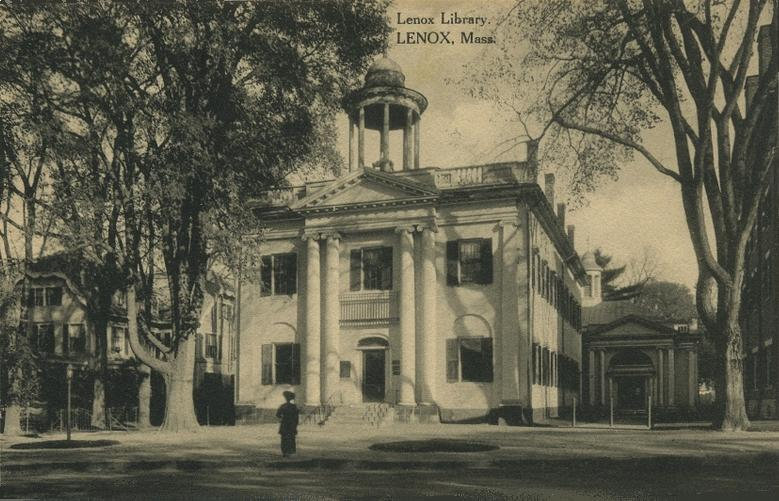
Lenox Library c. 1909

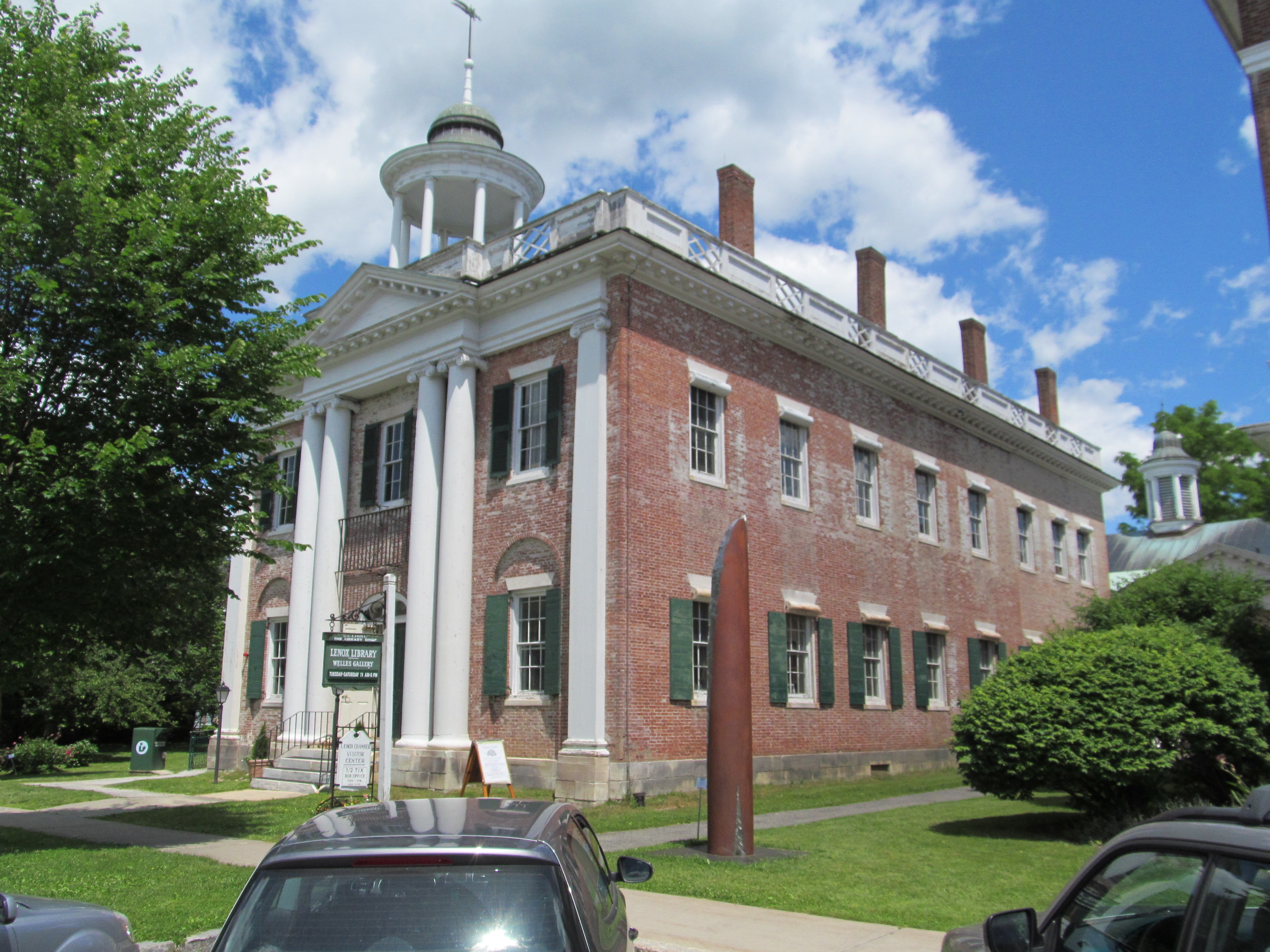
Lenox Library c. 2012

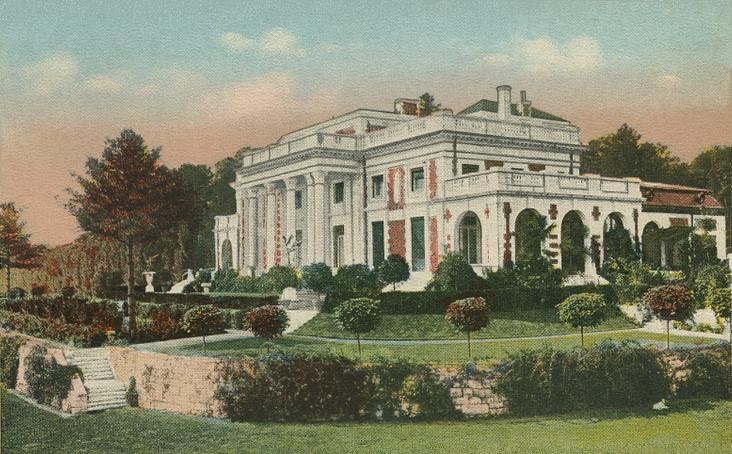
Bellefontaine in 1912

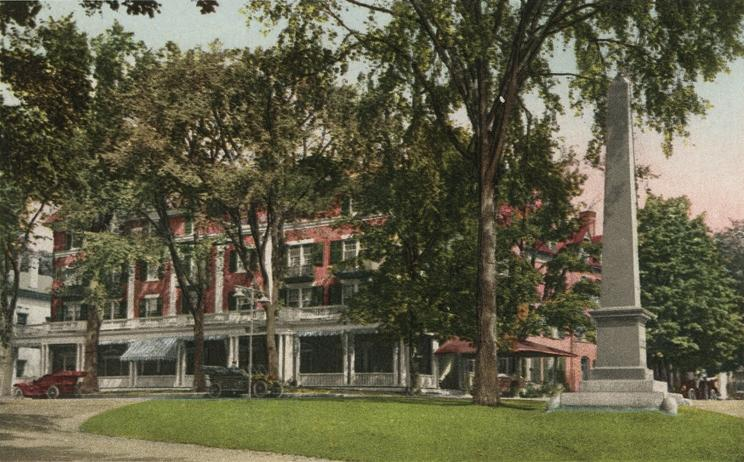
Curtis Hotel c. 1910

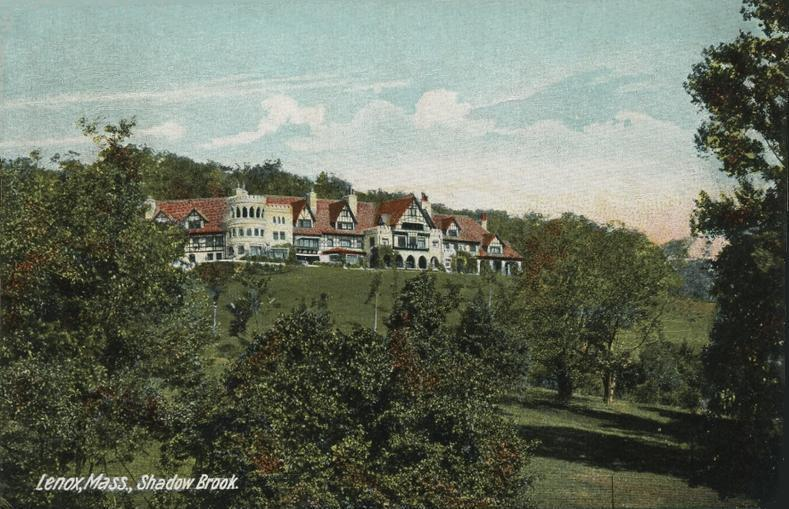
Shadowbrook in 1908

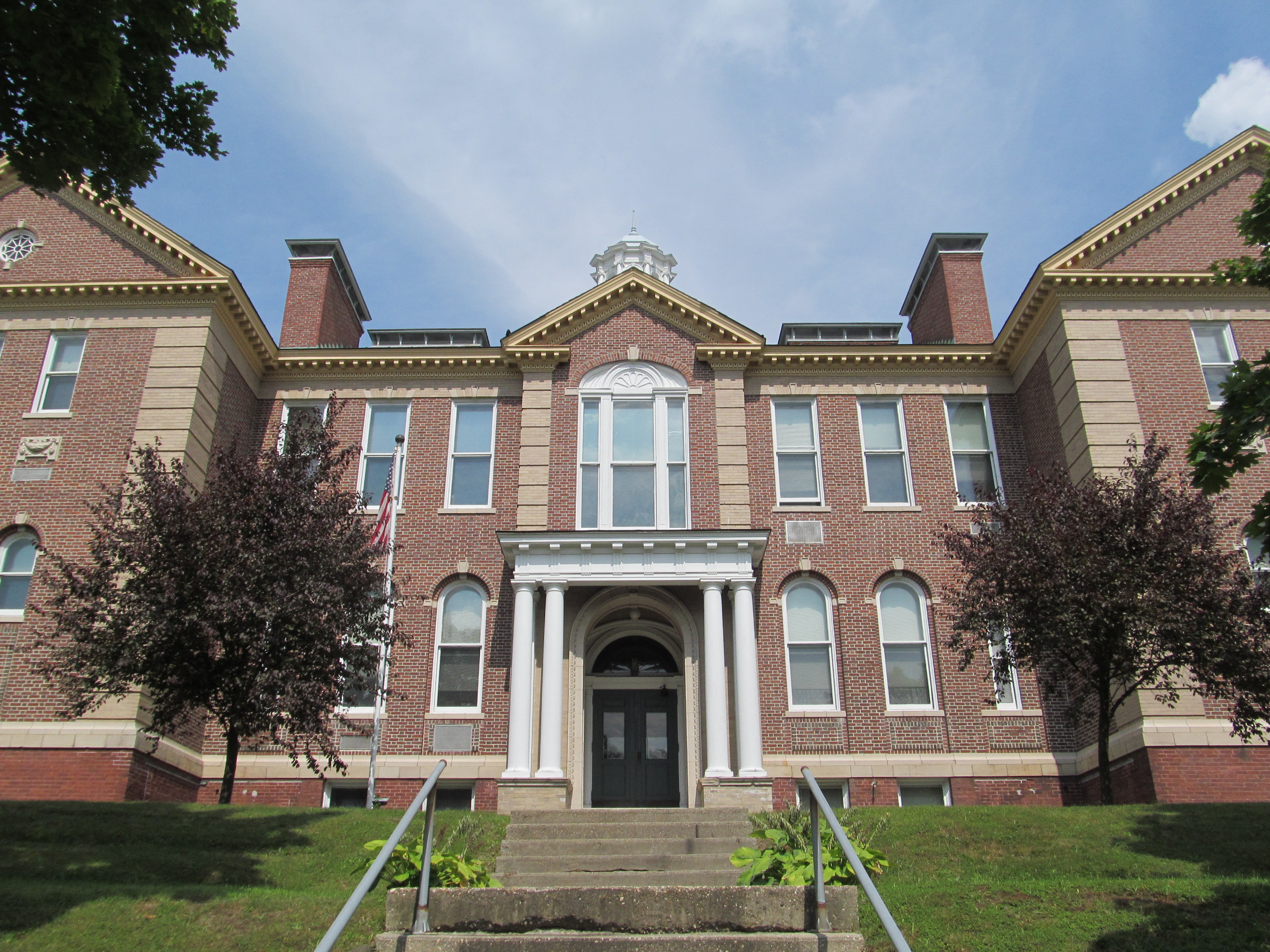
Lenox High School, 1908 building

== Geography ==
According to the United States Census Bureau, the town has a total area of 21.7 square miles (56.1 km^{2}), of which 21.2 square miles (55.0 km^{2}) is land and 0.46 square miles (1.2 km^{2}) is water. Lenox is bordered by Pittsfield to the north, Washington to the east, Lee to the southeast, Stockbridge to the southwest, and Richmond to the west. The town center is 8 miles (13 km) south of downtown Pittsfield, 45 miles (72 km) west-northwest of Springfield, and 125 miles (201 km) west of Boston.

Lenox is set apart from Richmond to the west by a branch of the Berkshire Mountains, with the highest peak in the ridge being Yokun Seat at 2,146 feet (654 m). To the east, October Mountain rises above the Housatonic River, which flows along that side of town and is impeded by a dam that forms Woods Pond. Contamination with PCBs is highest in the section of the River from Pittsfield to Woods Pond. Parts of the Housatonic Valley Wildlife Management Area and October Mountain State Forest line the river's east banks there. Several marshy brooks also feed into the river throughout town. The town is also home to the Pleasant Valley Wildlife Sanctuary south of Yokun Seat, the Wyndhyrst Resort and Golf Club, and a Miraval Spa.

Routes 7 and 20 meet in the southern end of town, heading north along a bypass road towards Pittsfield. Massachusetts Route 7A, the original path of Route 7, passes through the center of town, with a short distance combined with Massachusetts Route 183, which begins near the start of the bypass road. The town center is 5 miles (8 km) from Exit 2 of the Massachusetts Turnpike (Interstate 90), the nearest interstate highway.

Along the Housatonic River, the Housatonic Railroad route between Pittsfield and Great Barrington passes from north to south. Penn Central trains last made stops at Lenox Railroad Station in 1970. Amtrak rail service on the Lake Shore Limited can be found in Pittsfield, and the town is served by the Berkshire Regional Transit Authority (BRTA), with regional bus service through Pittsfield. Pittsfield is also the site of the nearest regional airport, the Pittsfield Municipal Airport. The town is roughly equidistantly located between the two nearest airports with national flights, Albany International Airport in New York and Bradley International Airport in Connecticut.

== Demographics ==
Historical population
Year	Pop.	±%
1790	1,160	—
1850	1,599	+37.8%
1860	1,711	+7.0%
1870	1,965	+14.8%
1880	2,043	+4.0%
1890	2,889	+41.4%
1900	2,942	+1.8%
1910	3,060	+4.0%
1920	2,691	−12.1%
1930	2,742	+1.9%
1940	2,884	+5.2%
1950	3,627	+25.8%
1960	4,253	+17.3%
1970	5,804	+36.5%
1980	6,523	+12.4%
1990	5,069	−22.3%
2000	5,077	+0.2%
2010	5,025	−1.0%
2020	5,095	+1.4%
2022*	5,064	−0.6%
* = population estimate. Source: United States census records and Population Estimates Program data.

As of the census of 2000, there were 5,077 people, 2,212 households, and 1,291 families residing in the town. Lenox ranks eighth out of the 32 cities and towns in Berkshire county by population, and 244th out of the 351 cities and towns in Massachusetts. The population density was 239.3 inhabitants per square mile (92.4/km^{2}) ranking 5th in the county and 236th in the Commonwealth. There were 2,713 housing units at an average density of 127.9 per square mile (49.4/km^{2}). The racial makeup of the town was 98.57% White, 0.30% Black or African American, 0.08% Native American, 0.02% Asian, 0.04% Pacific Islander, 0.41% from other races, and 0.57% from two or more races. 1.91% of the population were Hispanic or Latino of any race.

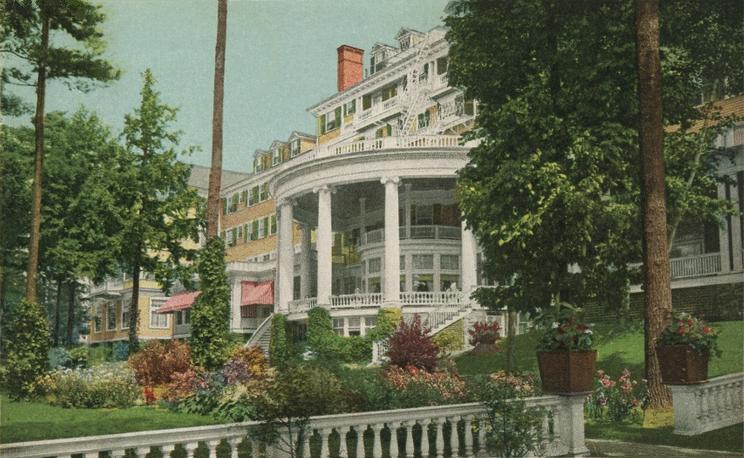
Hotel Aspinwall in 1912, now the site of Kennedy Park

There were 2,212 households, out of which 22.6% had children under the age of 18 living with them, 49.7% were married couples living together, 6.8% had a female householder with no husband present, and 41.6% were non-families. 36.3% of all households were made up of individuals, and 20.8% had someone living alone who was 65 years of age or older. The average household size was 2.17 and the average family size was 2.84.

In the town, the population was spread out, with 20.8% under the age of 18, 5.1% from 18 to 24, 22.8% from 25 to 44, 26.9% from 45 to 64, and 24.4% who were 65 years of age or older. The median age was 46 years. For every 100 females, there were 84.3 males. For every 100 females age 18 and over, there were 79.5 males.

The median income for a household in the town was $85,581, and the median income for a family was $111,413. Males had a median income of $61,226 versus $55,063 for females. The per capita income for the town was $53,263. 4.9% of the population and 3.6% of families were below the poverty line. Out of the total population, 7.3% of those under the age of 18 and 5.8% of those 65 and older were living below the poverty line.

== Government ==
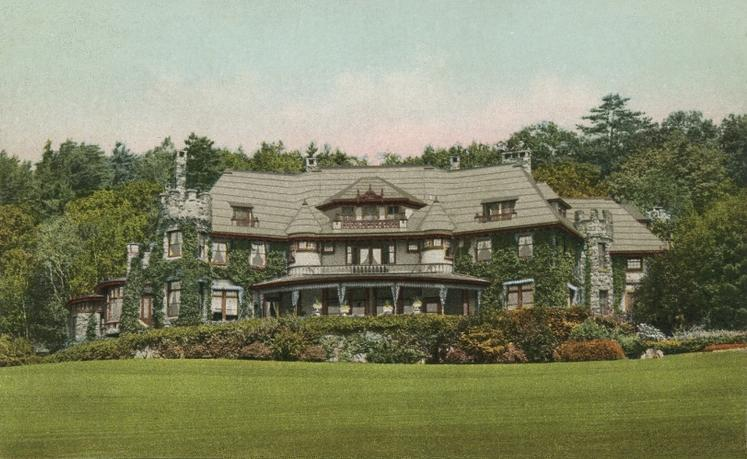
Belvoir Terrace in 1912

Lenox employs the open town meeting form of government, and is governed by a board of selectmen and a town manager. The town has its own full-time police, fire, ambulance, and public works departments. The Lenox Library, founded in 1856, has occupied the former county courthouse since 1874. It is a member of the regional library network. The nearest hospital, Berkshire Medical Center, is located in Pittsfield.

On the state level, Lenox is represented in the Massachusetts House of Representatives by the Fourth Berkshire district, which covers southern Berkshire County, as well as the westernmost towns in Hampden County. In the Massachusetts Senate, the town is represented by the Berkshire, Hampshire and Franklin district, which includes all of Berkshire County and western Hampshire and Franklin Counties. The town is patrolled by the First (Lee) Station of Barracks "B" of the Massachusetts State Police.

On the national level, Lenox is represented in the United States House of Representatives as part of Massachusetts's 1st congressional district, and has been represented by Richard Neal since January 2013. Massachusetts is represented in the United States Senate by Elizabeth Warren and Ed Markey.

== Education ==
Lenox operates its own school system for the town's 800 students. It is the only town in the county whose schools do not have a formal tuition agreement with any other town (other students may attend, however). Morris Elementary School houses students from pre-kindergarten through fifth grade, and Lenox Memorial Middle and High School houses students through twelfth grade. In 1966 Lenox Memorial High School moved from its 1908 building to a new campus co-located with the town's middle school. The school's athletic teams are called the "Millionaires", in acknowledgement of the town's history, and their colors are maroon and gold. The school's longtime rivals are the Lee Wildcats. Additionally, Lenox is home to two special education schools (Valleycrest School and the Hillcrest Center), as well as private schools, Berkshire Christian, which serves students from pre-kindergarten through grade 8, Berkshire Country Day School, which serves students from pre-kindergarten through ninth grade, and The Montessori School of the Berkshires, which serves toddlers through middle school students.

The nearest community college is Berkshire Community College in Pittsfield. The nearest state colleges are Massachusetts College of Liberal Arts in North Adams, and Westfield State University. The nearest private college is Williams College in Williamstown.

== Sites of interest ==
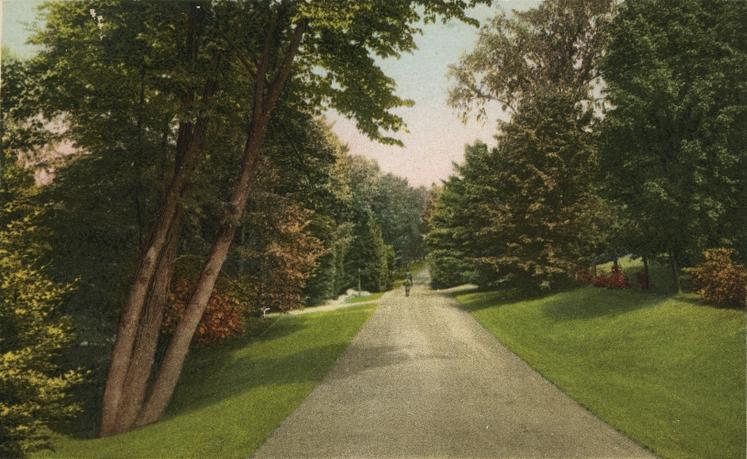
Yokun Avenue c. 1910

- Berkshire Scenic Railway Museum
- Church on the Hill
- Frelinghuysen Morris House and Studio
- Kripalu Center
- Lenox Railroad Station
- The Mount (Edith Wharton estate)
- The Museum of the Gilded Age at Ventfort Hall
- Pleasant Valley Wildlife Sanctuary
- Yokun Ridge
- Shakespeare & Company
- Tanglewood
- Ventfort Hall
- Bellefontaine

== Notable people ==
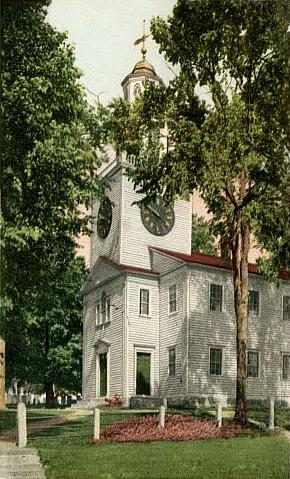
Church on the Hill c. 1910

- Alice Brock, artist and restaurateur
- Andrew Carnegie, industrialist
- Giraud Foster, socialite and industrialist
- David Greetham, textual scholar
- Frank T. Hassa, Wisconsin State Assemblyman
- Nathaniel Hawthorne, writer
- Fanny Kemble, actress and writer
- George M. Landers, congressman
- Rose Hawthorne Lathrop, social worker
- Stefan Lorant, author, editor, photographer; "father of photojournalism"
- Bernadette Mayer, poet
- George Morell, jurist
- Charles Henry Parkhurst, Congregational minister
- John Paterson, general and congressman
- Gilmore Schjeldahl, American businessman and inventor
- Catharine Sedgwick, writer
- William L. Shirer, journalist and historian
- Maureen Stapleton, actress
- Anson Phelps Stokes, financier
- James Taylor, singer-songwriter and guitarist
- George Westinghouse, industrialist
- Edith Wharton, writer
- Robert Shaw Sturgis Whitman, Episcopal clergyman
- James Van Der Zee, photographer
- Grenville Lindall Winthrop, art collector and philanthropist
- Jennie Louise Touissant Welcome, artist, photographer, and filmmaker
- Finn Wittrock, actor

== See also ==
- Lenox School of Jazz
