= Lenox (CDP), Massachusetts =

Lenox, Massachusetts
- Census-designated place
- Lenox, Massachusetts, from the southwest

- Location in Berkshire County and the state of Massachusetts.
- Coordinates: 42°21′26″N 73°17′3″W
- Country: United States
- State: Massachusetts
- County: Berkshire
- Town: Lenox

Area
  - Total: 2.00 sq mi (5.19 km^{2})
  - Land: 2.00 sq mi (5.17 km^{2})
  - Water: 0.012 sq mi (0.03 km^{2})
- Elevation: 1,257 ft (383 m)

Population (2020)
  - Total: 1,639
  - Density: 821.4/sq mi (317.13/km^{2})
- Time zone: UTC-5 (Eastern (EST))
  - Summer (DST): UTC-4 (EDT)
- ZIP code: 01240
- Area code: 413
- FIPS code: 25-34935
- GNIS feature ID: 0607513

Lenox, also known as Lenox Center, is a census-designated place (CDP) in the town of Lenox in Berkshire County, Massachusetts, United States. The population was 1,675 at the 2010 census, out of 5,025 in the entire town of Lenox.

== Geography ==
The Lenox CDP is located southwest of the geographic center of the town of Lenox at 42°21′25″N 73°17′3″W (42.35722, -73.284172). It is bordered to the south and west by the town of Stockbridge. Massachusetts Route 7A passes through the center of the CDP, heading north on Main Street and south on Kemble Street. In both directions it ends at U.S. Route 7, which bypasses the town center and forms the eastern edge of the CDP. Massachusetts Route 183 crosses Route 7A in the center of town, leading southeast through Lenox Dale towards East Lee, and southwest into the Interlaken section of Stockbridge.

According to the United States Census Bureau, the Lenox CDP has a total area of 1.8 square miles (4.7 km^{2}), of which 0.012 square miles (0.03 km^{2}), or 0.53%, is water.

== Demographics ==
Historical population
Census	Pop.	Note	%±
2020	1,639		—
U.S. Decennial Census

As of the census of 2000, there were 1,667 people, 885 households, and 386 families residing in the CDP. The population density was 359.6 people/km^{2} (931 people/mi^{2}). There were 1,045 housing units at an average density of 225.4 units/km^{2} (584 units/mi^{2}). The racial makeup of the CDP was 97.66% White, 0.60% Black or African American, 0.06% Native American, 0.78% Asian, 0.36% from other races, and 0.54% from two or more races. Hispanic or Latino of any race were 1.74% of the population.

There were 885 households, out of which 15.9% had children under the age of 18 living with them, 34.6% were married couples living together, 7.7% had a female householder with no husband present, and 56.3% were non-families. 49.9% of all households were made up of individuals, and 29.7% had someone living alone who was 65 years of age or older. The average household size was 1.84 and the average family size was 2.69.

In the CDP, the population was spread out, with 15.4% under the age of 18, 4.7% from 18 to 24, 21.7% from 25 to 44, 24.6% from 45 to 64, and 33.7% who were 65 years of age or older. The median age was 51 years. For every 100 females, there were 71.3 males. For every 100 females age 18 and over, there were 67.4 males.

The median income for a household in the CDP was $35,662, and the median income for a family was $60,893. Males had a median income of $41,875 versus $35,208 for females. The per capita income for the CDP was $23,810. About 3.6% of families and 12.3% of the population were below the poverty line, including 6.7% of those under age 18 and 12.3% of those age 65 or over.
