= Williamstown (CDP), Massachusetts =

Williamstown, Massachusetts
- Census-designated place
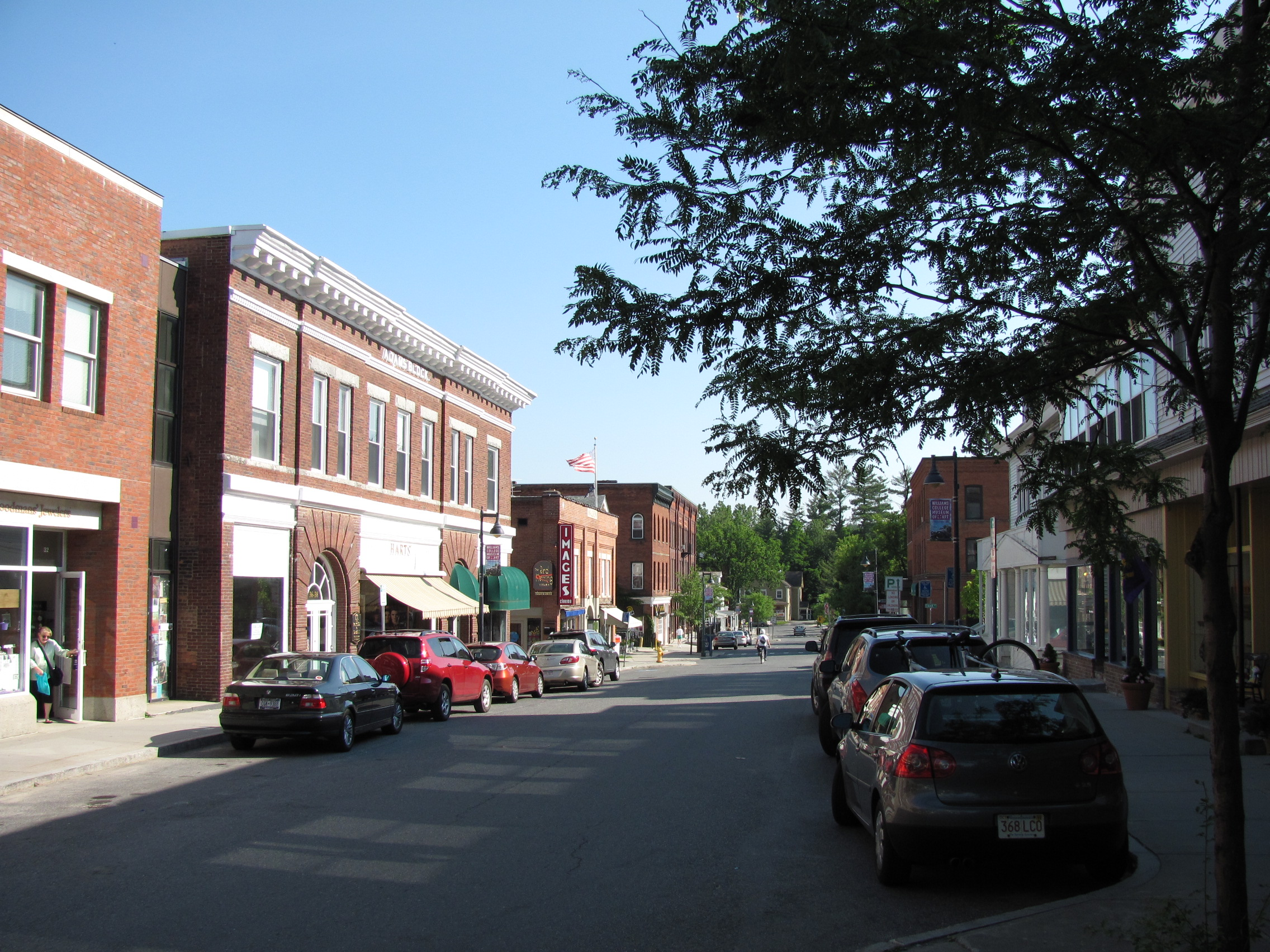
- Spring Street

- Location in Berkshire County and the state of Massachusetts.
- Coordinates: 42°42′34″N 73°11′51″W
- Country: United States
- State: Massachusetts
- County: Berkshire
- Town: Williamstown

Area
  - Total: 3.43 sq mi (8.88 km^{2})
  - Land: 3.40 sq mi (8.80 km^{2})
  - Water: 0.031 sq mi (0.08 km^{2})
- Elevation: 686 ft (209 m)

Population (2020)
  - Total: 4,308
  - Density: 1,267.7/sq mi (489.48/km^{2})
- Time zone: UTC-5 (Eastern (EST))
  - Summer (DST): UTC-4 (EDT)
- ZIP code: 01267
- Area code: 413
- FIPS code: 25-79950
- GNIS feature ID: 0607825

Williamstown is a census-designated place (CDP) in the town of Williamstown in Berkshire County, Massachusetts, United States. The population of the CDP was 4,325 at the 2010 census, out of 7,754 in the entire town.

== Geography ==
The Williamstown CDP is located in the northeastern part of the town of Williamstown at 42°42′34″N 73°11′50″W (42.709577, -73.197396). Williams College occupies much of the center of the CDP. At the west side of campus is the intersection of U.S. Route 7 and Massachusetts Route 2. Route 2 leads east through the CDP as Main Street and then becomes the Mohawk Trail as it continues east towards North Adams and the Connecticut River valley. Route 7 leaves to the north as North Street towards Vermont, and the two highways leave to the south as Cold Spring Road.

According to the United States Census Bureau, the CDP has a total area of 3.4 square miles (8.9 km^{2}), of which 3.4 square miles (8.8 km^{2}) is land, and 0.04 square miles (0.1 km^{2}), or 0.95%, is water. The Hoosic River, a tributary of the Hudson River, forms the northern edge of the CDP, and the Green River flows into the Hoosic River from the south.

== Demographics ==
Historical population
Census	Pop.	Note	%±
2020	4,308		—
U.S. Decennial Census

As of the census of 2000, there were 4,754 people, 1,368 households, and 715 families residing in the CDP. The population density was 536.7/km^{2} (1,389.8/mi^{2}). There were 1,550 housing units at an average density of 175.0/km^{2} (453.1/mi^{2}). The racial makeup of the CDP was 86.87% White, 3.83% Black or African American, 0.06% Native American, 4.80% Asian, 0.11% Pacific Islander, 1.20% from other races, and 3.13% from two or more races. Hispanic or Latino of any race were 3.64% of the population.

There were 1,368 households, out of which 21.1% had children under the age of 18 living with them, 41.9% were married couples living together, 7.7% had a female householder with no husband present, and 47.7% were non-families. 40.2% of all households were made up of individuals, and 18.3% had someone living alone who was 65 years of age or older. The average household size was 2.04 and the average family size was 2.75.

In the CDP, the population was spread out, with 11.7% under the age of 18, 45.0% from 18 to 24, 13.8% from 25 to 44, 15.8% from 45 to 64, and 13.7% who were 65 years of age or older. The median age was 22 years. For every 100 females, there were 92.2 males. For every 100 females age 18 and over, there were 91.3 males.

The median income for a household in the CDP was $40,223, and the median income for a family was $70,000. Males had a median income of $44,167 versus $23,702 for females. The per capita income for the CDP was $20,859. About 0.4% of families and 7.4% of the population were below the poverty line, including 1.7% of those under age 18 and 4.6% of those age 65 or over.
