= Housatonic, Massachusetts =

- Census-designated place
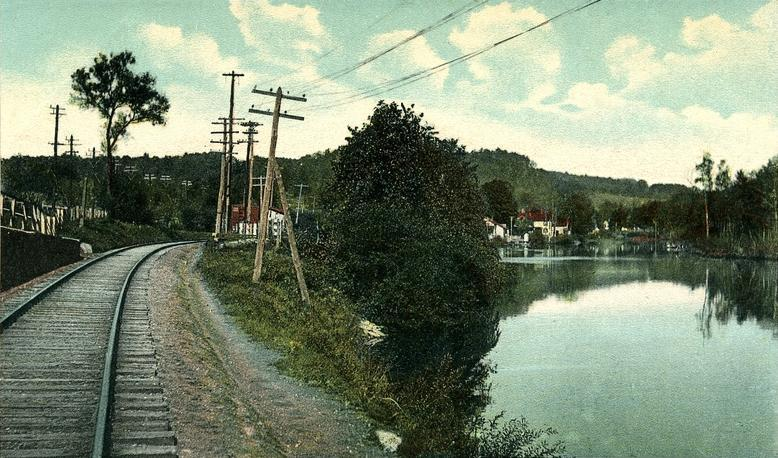
- Railroad tracks along the Housatonic River at Housatonic

- Location in Berkshire County and the state of Massachusetts.
- Coordinates: 42°15′8″N 73°22′3″W
- Country: United States
- State: Massachusetts
- County: Berkshire
- Town: Great Barrington

Area
  - Total: 0.98 sq mi (2.53 km^{2})
  - Land: 0.89 sq mi (2.31 km^{2})
  - Water: 0.085 sq mi (0.22 km^{2})
- Elevation: 735 ft (224 m)

Population (2020)
  - Total: 1,083
  - Density: 1,215.1/sq mi (469.17/km^{2})
- Time zone: UTC-5 (Eastern (EST))
  - Summer (DST): UTC-4 (EDT)
- ZIP Codes: 01236 (Housatonic); 01230 (Great Barrington)
- Area code: 413
- FIPS code: 25-31295
- GNIS feature ID: 0607478

Housatonic is a census-designated place (CDP) in the town of Great Barrington in Berkshire County, Massachusetts, United States. It is part of the Pittsfield, Massachusetts Metropolitan Statistical Area. As of the 2020 census, Housatonic had a population of 1,083. It was named after the Housatonic River.

== History ==
The village formed in the early 1800s around textile and paper mills. At its peak, Monument Mills, a textile manufacturer, occupied five factory buildings totaling 420,000 square feet (39,000 m^{2}) and had 500 employees. Mill workers, many of whom were immigrants, were housed in tenements.

Perspective map of Housatonic from 1890 with list of landmarks by L.R. Burleigh

Monument Mills closed in 1956. After undergoing a period of decline, the village has been revitalized by the presence of art galleries and related commercial activity. The town's Ramsdell Public Library is located in Housatonic. Monument Mills and Rising Paper Mill are listed on the National Register of Historic Places.

== Geography ==
Housatonic is located along the northern edge of the town of Great Barrington at 42°15′8″N 73°22′3″W (42.252122, -73.367537). It is bordered to the north by the towns of Stockbridge and West Stockbridge. The Housatonic River runs through the center of the community. Massachusetts Route 183 enters the CDP from the south as Park Street following the east bank of the river, then crosses the river at the center of town and continues north on the west bank as Front Street.

According to the United States Census Bureau, the CDP has a total area of 0.97 square miles (2.5 km^{2}), of which 0.89 square miles (2.3 km^{2}) is land, and 0.077 square miles (0.2 km^{2}) (8.84%) is water.

== Demographics ==
Historical population
Census	Pop.	Note	%±
2020	1,083		—
U.S. Decennial Census

As of the census of 2000, there were 1,335 people, 543 households, and 356 families residing in the CDP. The population density was 592.5 people/km^{2} (1,535 people/mi^{2}). There were 582 housing units at an average density of 258.3 units/km^{2} (669 units/mi^{2}). The racial makeup of the CDP was 96.48% White, 1.27% African American, 0.37% Asian, 0.07% Pacific Islander, 0.82% from other races, and 0.97% from two or more races. Hispanic or Latino of any race were 1.35% of the population.

There were 543 households, out of which 31.7% had children under the age of 18 living with them, 44.2% were married couples living together, 16.6% had a female householder with no husband present, and 34.3% were non-families. 27.6% of all households were made up of individuals, and 13.4% had someone living alone who was 65 years of age or older. The average household size was 2.46 and the average family size was 2.98.

In the CDP, the population was spread out, with 25.1% under the age of 18, 8.0% from 18 to 24, 27.7% from 25 to 44, 23.2% from 45 to 64, and 16.0% who were 65 years of age or older. The median age was 39 years. For every 100 females, there were 86.7 males. For every 100 females age 18 and over, there were 83.5 males.

The median income for a household in the CDP was $35,625, and the median income for a family was $35,324. Males had a median income of $38,462 versus $24,917 for females. The per capita income for the CDP was $16,636. About 9.9% of families and 10.9% of the population were below the poverty line, including 14.2% of those under age 18 and 2.6% of those age 65 or over.
