= West Stockbridge, Massachusetts =

- Town
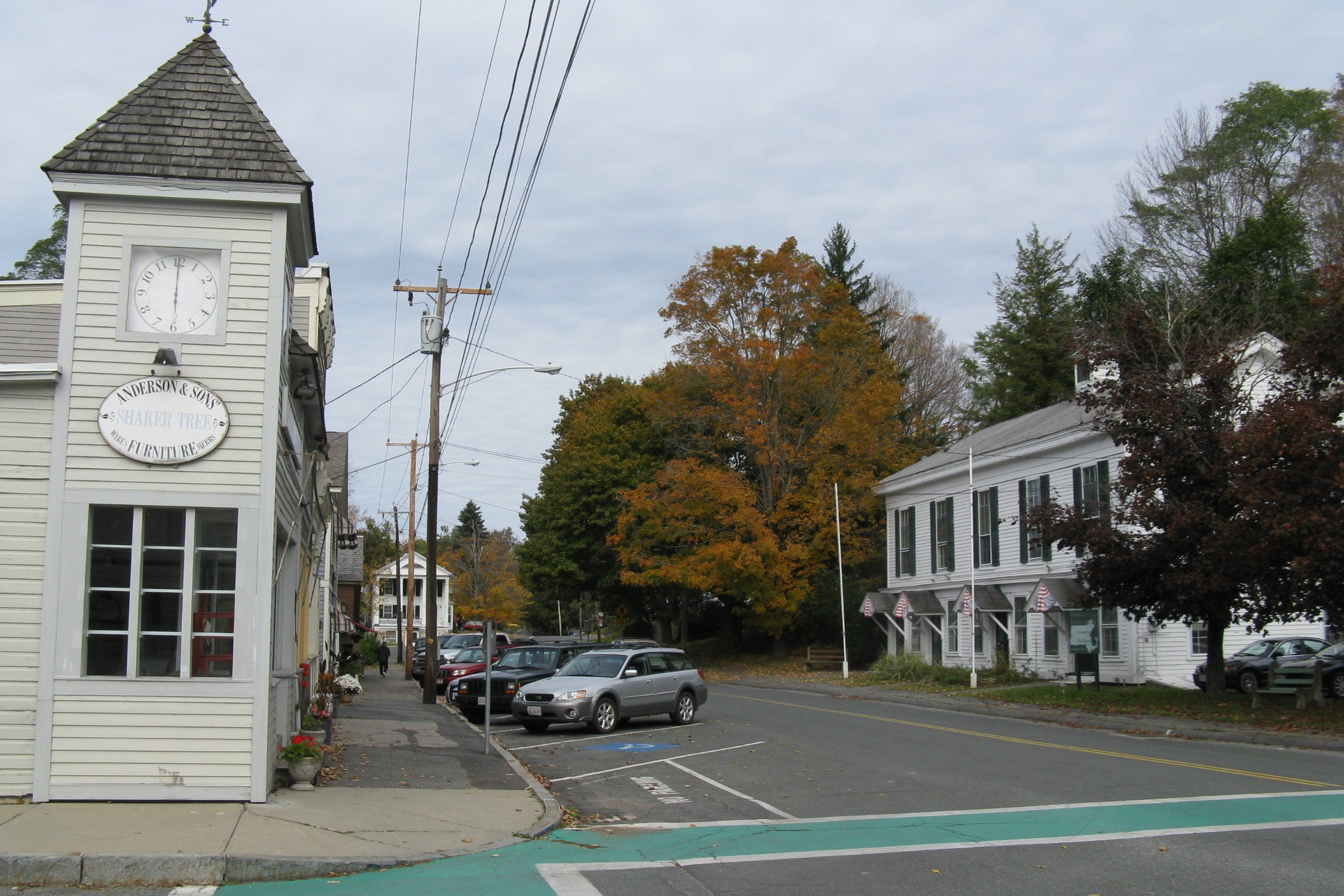
- Main Street in 2009

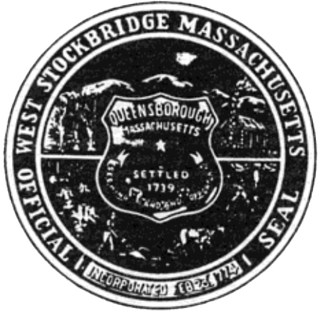
- Seal
- Nickname: Queensborough (former official name)
- Location in Berkshire County and the state of Massachusetts.
- Coordinates: 42°20′45″N 73°22′00″W
- Country: United States
- State: Massachusetts
- County: Berkshire
- Settled: 1766
- Incorporated: 1775

Government
  - Type: Open town meeting

Area
  - Total: 18.7 sq mi (48.4 km^{2})
  - Land: 18.5 sq mi (47.8 km^{2})
  - Water: 0.23 sq mi (0.6 km^{2})
- Elevation: 902 ft (275 m)

Population (2020)
  - Total: 1,343
  - Density: 72.8/sq mi (28.1/km^{2})
- Time zone: UTC-5 (Eastern)
  - Summer (DST): UTC-4 (Eastern)
- ZIP Codes: 01266 (West Stockbridge); 01236 (Housatonic)
- Area code: 413
- FIPS code: 25-77990
- GNIS feature ID: 0618276
- Website: www.weststockbridge-ma.gov

West Stockbridge is a town in Berkshire County, Massachusetts, United States. The town had a population of 1,343 at the time of the 2020 United States census. It is part of the Pittsfield, Massachusetts Metropolitan Statistical Area.

== History ==
West Stockbridge was first settled in 1766 and was officially incorporated in 1774. The town grew out of Stockbridge, formerly known as Indiantown, and was originally called Queensborough. The area was part of the disputed border between Massachusetts and New York, which eventually left the town in its current state. The town grew as five separate villages (West Center, West Stockbridge, Freedleyville, Rockdale and Williamsville), with West Stockbridge growing the largest because of the railroad, which hauled iron ore and marble. The town had an ironworks in Williamsville, founded by Colonel Elijah Williams, and the furnace smokestack is the only part which remains of the works.

== Geography ==
According to the United States Census Bureau, the town has a total area of 18.7 square miles (48.4 km^{2}), of which 18.5 square miles (47.8 km^{2}) is land and 0.15 square miles (0.4 km^{2}), or 1.23%, is water.

West Stockbridge is bordered on the north by Richmond, on the east by Stockbridge, on the south by Great Barrington, on the southwest by Alford, and on the west by Austerlitz and Canaan, New York. West Stockbridge is 11 miles (18 km) south-southwest of Pittsfield, Massachusetts, 50 miles (80 km) west-northwest of Springfield, 132 miles (212 km) west of Boston, and 36 miles (58 km) southeast of Albany, New York.

West Stockbridge is situated along the Williams River, a marshy tributary of the Housatonic River. To the northeast, West Stockbridge Mountain lies along the Stockbridge town line. To the southwest, Tom Ball Mountain rises above the Alford town line, and Harvey Mountain rises on the state border. Maple Hill rises in the center of town, and is covered by a wildlife management area.

Interstate 90, the Massachusetts Turnpike, crosses into the state in West Stockbridge. Exit 1, which solely consists of a western exit and eastern entrance, is located near the center of town, near the southern junction of Route 41 and Route 102, which begins on the state border in the village of State Line.

An abandoned rail line crosses through town, adjoining the active line in State Line and heading southward through town towards Great Barrington. The nearest regional transportation services can all be reached in Pittsfield, including bus, Amtrak and air service. The nearest national air service is at Albany International Airport in New York.

== Demographics ==
Historical population
Year	Pop.	±%
1790	1,113	—
1850	1,713	+53.9%
1860	1,589	−7.2%
1870	1,924	+21.1%
1880	1,923	−0.1%
1890	1,492	−22.4%
1900	1,158	−22.4%
1910	1,271	+9.8%
1920	1,058	−16.8%
1930	1,124	+6.2%
1940	1,062	−5.5%
1950	1,165	+9.7%
1960	1,244	+6.8%
1970	1,354	+8.8%
1980	1,280	−5.5%
1990	1,483	+15.9%
2000	1,416	−4.5%
2010	1,306	−7.8%
2020	1,343	+2.8%
2022*	1,329	−1.0%
* = population estimate. Source: United States census records and Population Estimates Program data.

As of the census of 2000, there were 1,416 people, 601 households, and 406 families residing in the town. By population, West Stockbridge ranks 18th out of the 32 cities and towns in Berkshire County, and 310th out of 351 cities and towns in Massachusetts. The population density was 76.6 inhabitants per square mile (29.6/km^{2}), which rank 15th in the county and 299th in the Commonwealth. There were 769 housing units at an average density of 41.6 per square mile (16.1/km^{2}). The racial makeup of the town was 98.09% White, 0.28% African American, 0.07% Native American, 0.92% Asian, 0.07% from other races, and 0.56% from two or more races. Hispanic or Latino of any race were 0.85% of the population.

There were 601 households, out of which 28.1% had children under the age of 18 living with them, 56.9% were married couples living together, 8.5% had a female householder with no husband present, and 32.4% were non-families. 27.0% of all households were made up of individuals, and 13.1% had someone living alone who was 65 years of age or older. The average household size was 2.35 and the average family size was 2.86.

In the town, the population was spread out, with 21.8% under the age of 18, 4.9% from 18 to 24, 24.8% from 25 to 44, 31.6% from 45 to 64, and 16.9% who were 65 years of age or older. The median age was 44 years. For every 100 females, there were 96.1 males. For every 100 females age 18 and over, there were 92.2 males.

The median income for a household in the town was $120,000, and the median income for a family was $100,000. Males had a median income of $95,000 versus $79,000 for females. The per capita income for the town was $90,000. About 1.8% of families and 4.3% of the population were below the poverty line, including 1.3% of those under age 18 and 3.8% of those age 65 or over.

== Government ==
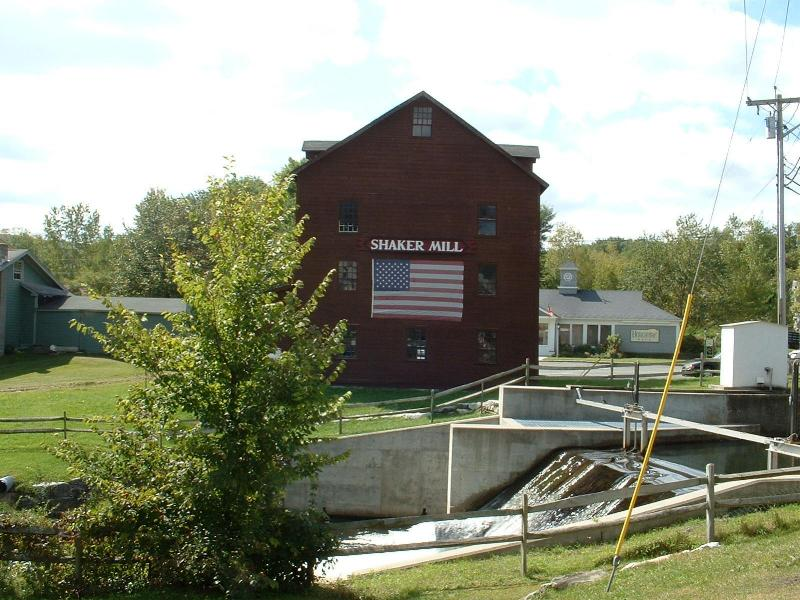
Shaker Mill, located along the Williams River

West Stockbridge employs the open town meeting form of government, and is led by a Select Board and a Town Administrator. The town has its own services, including police, fire and public works, as well as a post office. The town operates a library four days a week, which is connected to the regional library systems.

On the state level, West Stockbridge is represented in the Massachusetts House of Representatives by the Fourth Berkshire district, which covers southern Berkshire County, as well as the westernmost towns in Hampden County. In the Massachusetts Senate, the town is represented by the Berkshire, Hampshire and Franklin district, which includes all of Berkshire County and western Hampshire and Franklin counties. The town is patrolled by the First (Lee) Station of Barracks "B" of the Massachusetts State Police.

On the national level, West Stockbridge is represented in the United States House of Representatives as part of Massachusetts's 1st congressional district, and is represented by Richard Neal. Massachusetts is currently represented in the United States Senate by senior Senator Elizabeth Warren and junior Senator Ed Markey.

West Stockbridge presidential election results
Year	Democratic	Republican	Third parties	Total Votes	Margin
2020	80.74% 784	16.89% 164	2.37% 23	971	63.85%
2016	73.96% 659	19.98% 178	6.06% 54	891	53.98%
2012	79.80% 707	18.17% 161	2.03% 18	886	61.63%
2008	80.45% 720	16.98% 152	2.57% 23	895	63.46%
2004	76.52% 691	21.71% 196	1.77% 16	903	54.82%
2000	60.99% 494	26.17% 212	12.84% 104	810	34.81%
1996	66.41% 514	21.96% 170	11.63% 90	774	44.44%
1992	56.56% 474	25.54% 214	17.90% 150	838	31.03%
1988	57.63% 442	40.55% 311	1.83% 14	767	17.08%
1984	45.88% 323	53.84% 379	0.28% 2	704	7.95%
1980	39.83% 284	40.11% 286	20.06% 143	713	0.28%
1976	50.97% 367	46.25% 333	2.78% 20	720	4.72%
1972	46.26% 266	52.52% 302	1.22% 7	575	6.26%
1968	43.59% 245	47.86% 269	8.54% 48	562	4.27%
1964	72.36% 411	27.11% 154	0.53% 3	568	45.25%
1960	52.04% 332	47.65% 304	0.31% 2	638	4.39%
1956	30.85% 186	68.82% 415	0.33% 2	603	37.98%
1952	35.58% 216	64.25% 390	0.16% 1	607	28.67%
1948	46.09% 230	53.31% 266	0.60% 3	499	7.21%
1944	49.54% 217	50.46% 221	0.00% 0	438	0.91%
1940	48.41% 243	51.20% 257	0.40% 2	502	2.79%

== Education ==
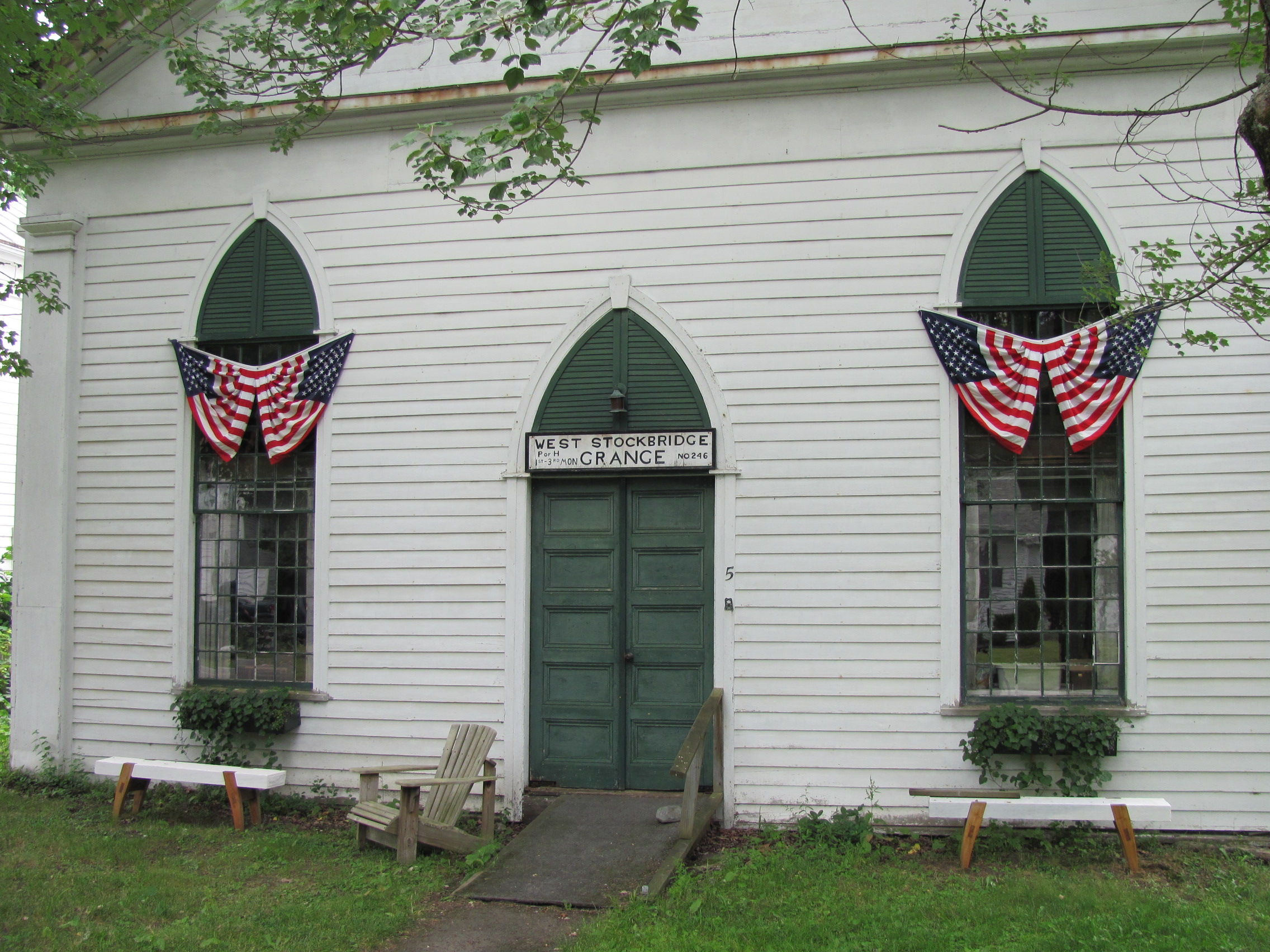
West Stockbridge Grange No. 246

West Stockbridge is a member of the Berkshire Hills Regional School District, along with Stockbridge and Great Barrington, which hosts all the district's schools. All students in the district attend the Muddy Brook Regional School from pre-kindergarten through fourth grades. Middle school students attend Monument Valley Regional Middle School, and high school students attend Monument Mountain Regional High School. Prior to creation of the regional district, high school students in West Stockbridge attended the former Williams High School in Stockbridge. There are private schools located in the nearby towns of Great Barrington and Lenox which are also open to students from the town.

The nearest community college is the South County branch of Berkshire Community College in Great Barrington. The nearest state college is Massachusetts College of Liberal Arts in North Adams, and the nearest state university is the University of Massachusetts Amherst. The nearest private college is Williams College in Williamstown.

== Culture ==
Turn Park Art Space, an art museum, sculpture park, and performance space, opened on the site of a former limestone and marble quarry in May 2017.
