= National Register of Historic Places property types =

Types of properties of the U.S. National Register of Historic Places

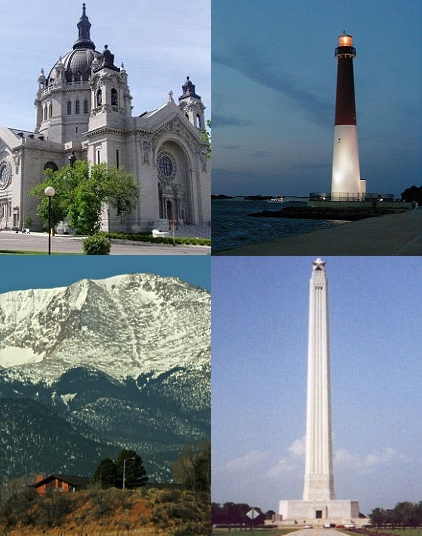
Clockwise from bottom left: a site, a building, a structure and an object. All are examples of National Register of Historic Places property types.

The U.S. National Register of Historic Places (NRHP) classifies its listings by various types of properties. Listed properties generally fall into one of five categories, though there are special considerations for other types of properties which do not fit into these five broad categories or fit into more specialized subcategories. The five general categories for NRHP properties are: building, district, object, site, and structure.

== General categories ==
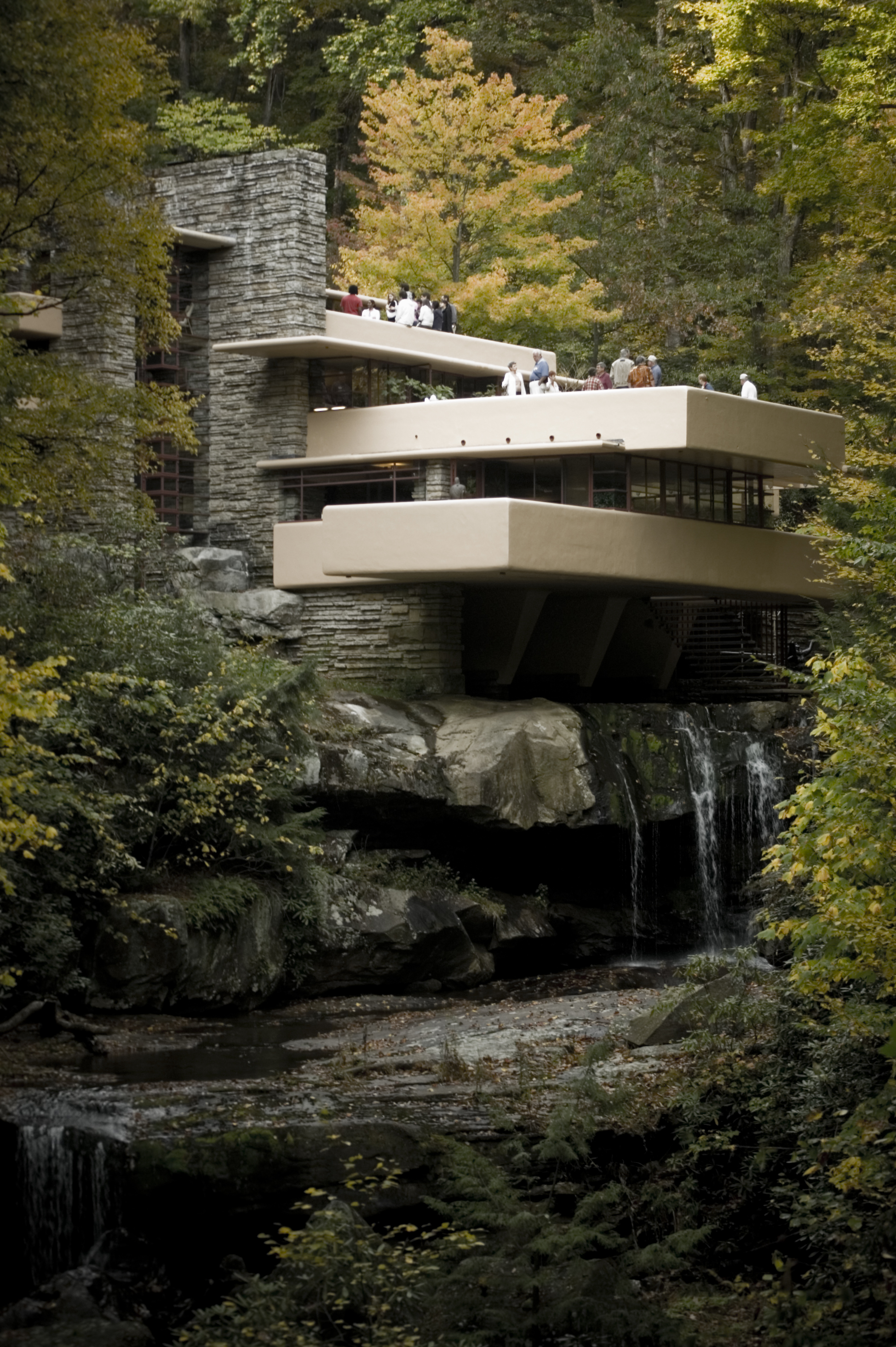
Frank Lloyd Wright's famous Fallingwater is an example of a building.

Listed properties (NRHP-listed properties) generally fall into one of five categories, though there are special considerations for other types of properties which do not fit into these five broad categories or fit into more specialized subcategories. The five general categories for NRHP properties are: building, structure, object, site, and district. When multiple like properties are submitted as a group and listed together, they are known as a Multiple Property Submission.

=== Building ===
Buildings, as defined by the National Register, are structures intended to shelter some sort of human activity. Examples include a house, barn, hotel, church or similar construction. The term building, as in outbuilding, can be used to refer to historically and functionally related units, such as a courthouse and a jail, or a barn and a house.

Buildings included on the National Register of Historic Places (NRHP-listed buildings) must have all of their basic structural elements as parts of buildings, such as ells and wings; interiors or facades are not independently eligible for the National Register. As such, the whole building is considered during the nomination and its significant features must be identified. If a nominated building has lost any of its basic structural elements, it is considered a ruin and categorized as a site.

=== Historic district ===
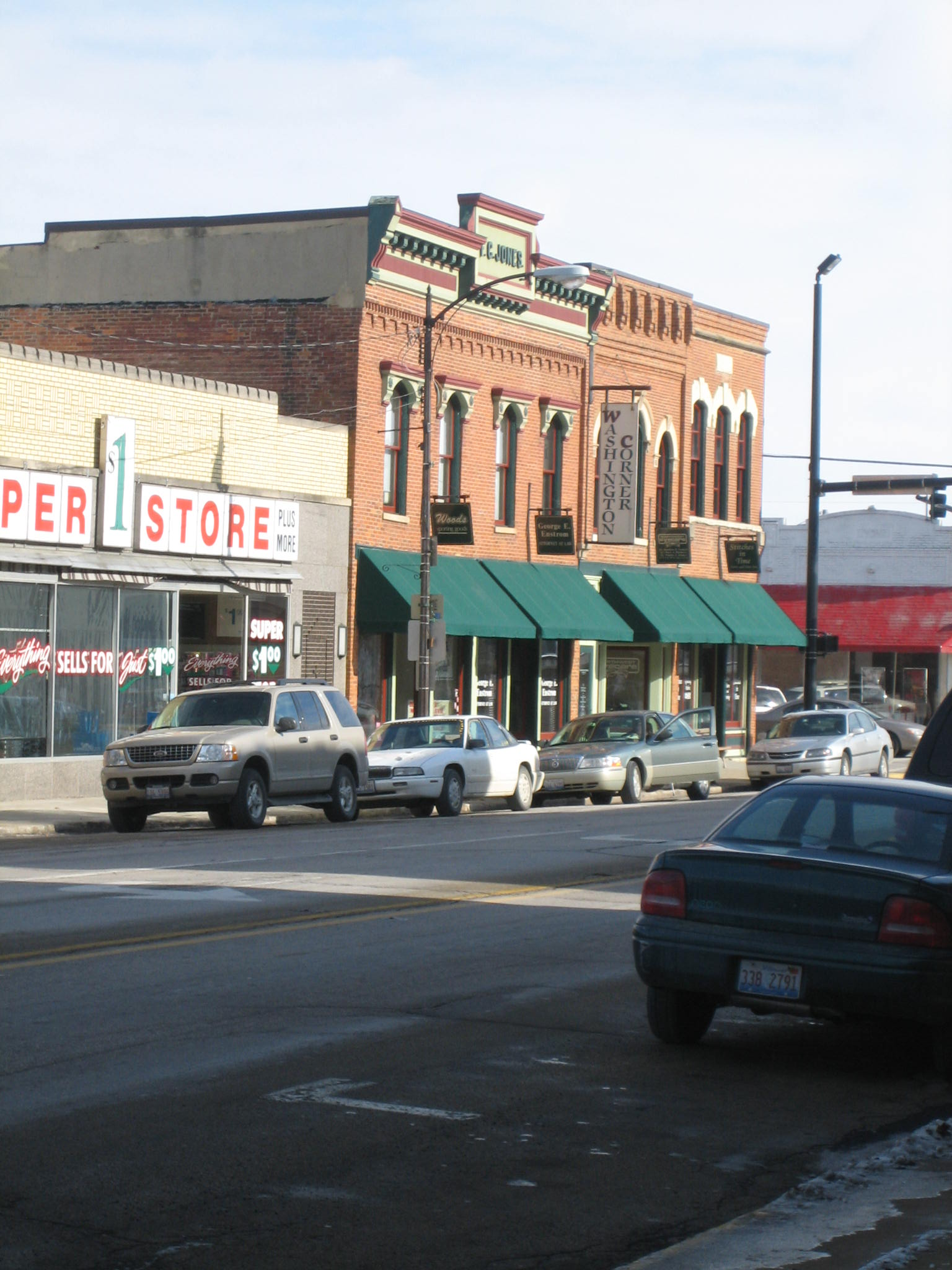
Historic districts often encompass numerous buildings, such as these in the Oregon Commercial Historic District, in Oregon, Illinois.

The National Register of Historic Places defines a historic district per U.S. federal law, last revised in 2004. According to the Register definition, a historic district is: "a geographically definable area, urban or rural, possessing a significant concentration, linkage, or continuity of sites, buildings, structures, or objects united by past events or aesthetically by plan or physical development. In addition, historic districts consist of contributing and non-contributing properties. Historic districts possess a concentration, linkage or continuity of the other four types of properties. Objects, structures, buildings and sites within a historic district are usually thematically linked by architectural style or designer, date of development, distinctive urban plan, and/or historic associations." For example, the largest collection of houses from 17th and 18th century America are found in the McIntire Historic District in Salem, Massachusetts.

Some NRHP-listed historic districts are further designated as National Historic Landmarks, and termed National Historic Landmark Districts. All National Historic Landmarks are NRHP-listed.

A contributing property is any building, structure, object or site within the boundaries of the district which reflects the significance of the district as a whole, either because of historic associations, historic architectural qualities or archaeological features. Another key aspect of the contributing property is historic integrity. Significant alterations to a property can damage its physical connections with the past, lowering its historic integrity.

=== Object ===
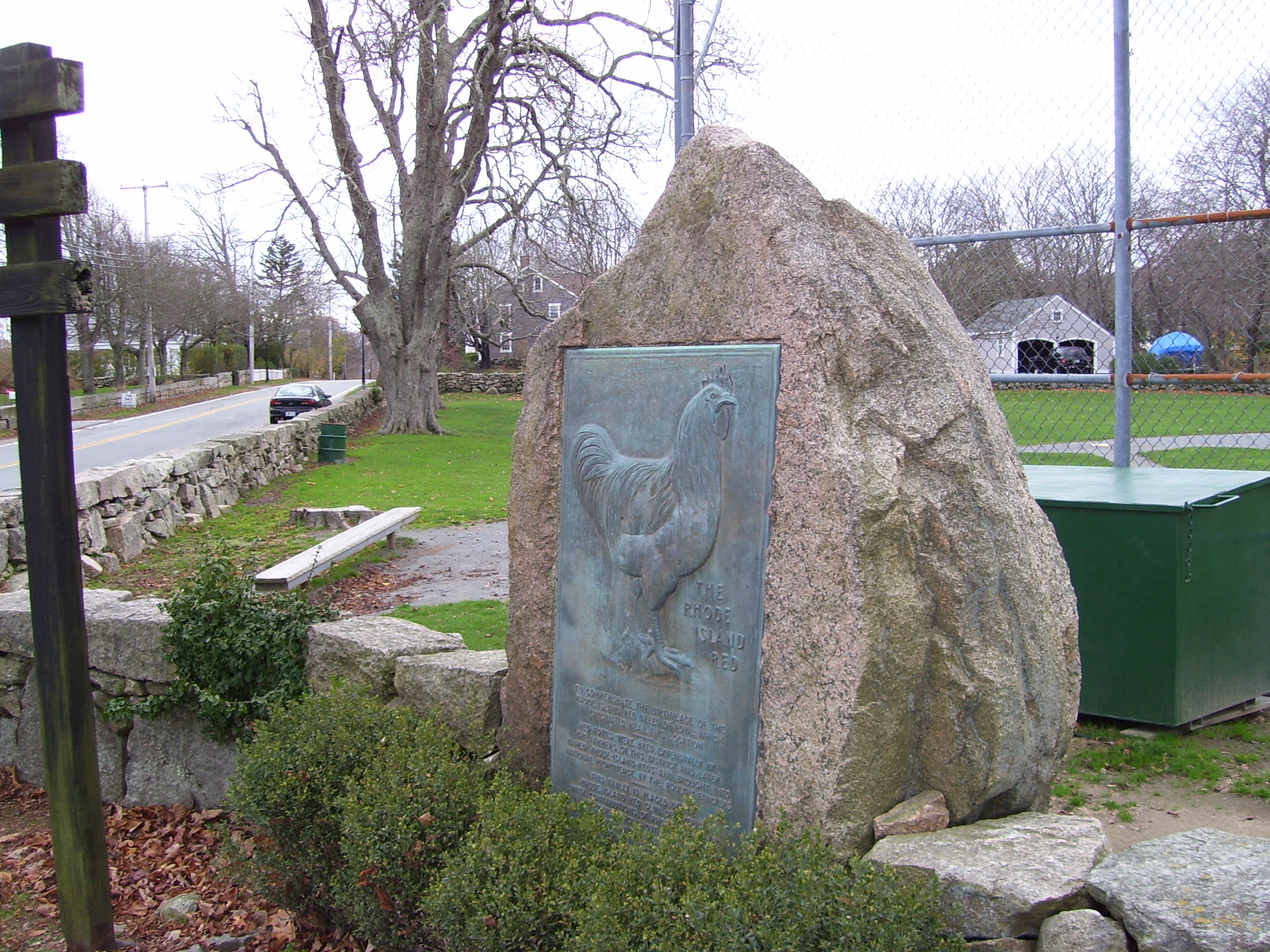
The Rhode Island Red Monument in Rhode Island is an example of an object

Objects are usually artistic in nature, or small in scale when compared to structures and buildings. Though objects may be movable, they are generally associated with a specific setting or environment. Examples of NRHP-listed objects include monuments, sculptures and fountains.

Objects considered for inclusion on the NRHP, whether individually or as part of districts, should be designed for a specific location; objects such as transportable sculpture, furniture, and other decorative arts that lack a specific place are discouraged. Fixed outdoor sculpture, an example of public art, is appropriate for inclusion on the Register. The setting of an object is important in relation to the Register. It should be appropriate to its significant historical use, roles, or character. In addition, objects that have been relocated to museums are not considered for inclusion on the Register.

=== Site ===
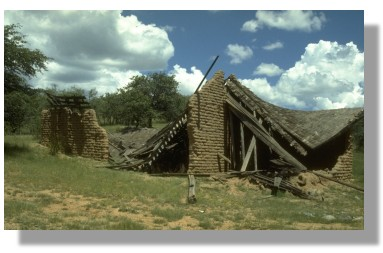
The ruins of this barn in Kentucky Camp Historic District, Arizona, qualify as a site.

Sites may include discrete areas significant solely for activities in that location in the past, such as battlefields, significant archaeological finds, designed landscapes (parks and gardens), and other locations whose significance is not related to a building or structure.

NRHP-listed sites often possess significance for their potential to yield information in the future, though they are added to the Register under all four of the criteria for inclusion. A sites need not have actual physical remains if it marks the location of a prehistoric or historic event, or if there were no buildings or structures present at the time of the events marked by the site. Site determination requires careful evaluation when the location of prehistoric or historic events cannot be conclusively determined.

=== Structure ===
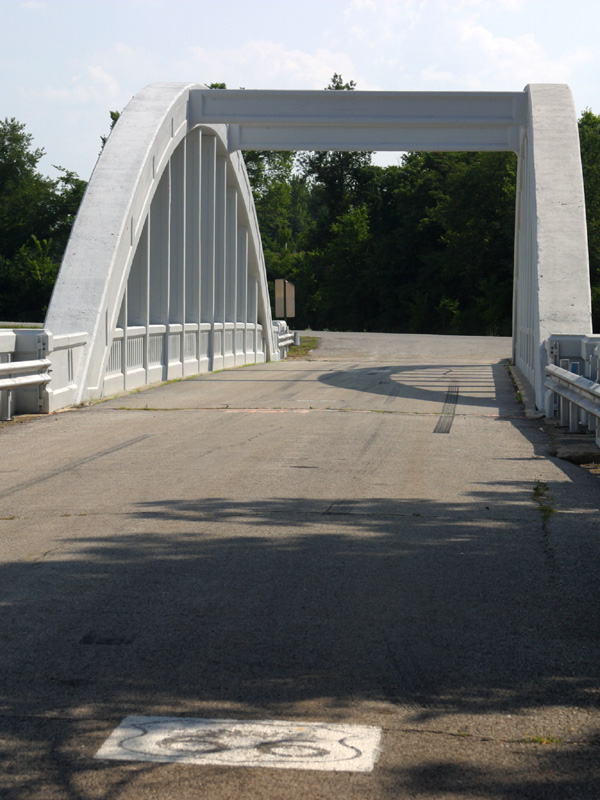
Brush Creek Bridge in Kansas is an example of a structure.

Structures differ from buildings, in that they are functional constructions meant to be used for purposes other than sheltering human activity. Examples include, an aircraft, a ship, a grain elevator, a gazebo and a bridge.

The criteria of significance are applied to nominated structures in much the same fashion as they are for buildings. To become a NRHP-listed structure the basic structural elements must all be intact; no individual parts of the structure are eligible for separate inclusion on the NRHP. An example would be a truss bridge being considered for inclusion. Said truss bridge is composed of metal or wooden truss, abutments and supporting piers; for the property to be considered eligible for the Register, all of these elements must be extant. Structures that have lost their historic configuration or pattern of organization through demolition or deterioration, much like buildings, are considered ruins and classified as sites.

== Other categories ==
There are several other types of properties that do not fall neatly into the categories listed above. The National Park Service publishes a series of bulletins designed to aid in evaluating properties for NRHP eligibility using the criteria for evaluation. Though the criteria for eligibility are always the same, the way they are applied can differ slightly, depending upon the type of property involved. Special Register bulletins cover application of the criteria for evaluation of: aids to navigation, historic battlefields, archaeological sites, aviation properties, cemeteries and burial places, historic designed landscapes, mining sites, post offices, properties associated with significant persons, properties achieving significance within the last 50 years, rural historic landscapes, traditional cultural properties, and vessels and shipwrecks.

=== Archaeological sites ===
Archaeological properties are subject to the same four criteria as other properties under consideration for the NRHP. Archaeological sites also must meet at least one of the criteria. Many listed properties which were added to the Register under the first, second and fourth criteria contain intact archaeological deposits. Often, these deposits are undocumented, for example a 19th-century farmstead is likely to contain intact, undocumented archaeological deposits.

=== Cultural landscapes ===
Cultural landscapes are defined as a geographic area, including both cultural and natural resources and the wildlife or domestic animals therein, associated with a historic event, activity, or person, or that exhibit other cultural or aesthetic values. There are four general types of cultural landscapes, not mutually exclusive: historic sites, historic designed landscapes, historic vernacular landscapes, and ethnographic landscapes.

=== Maritime sites ===
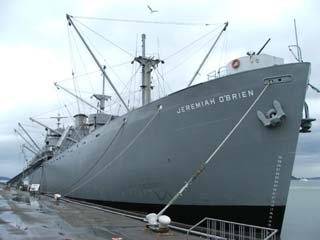
The SS Jeremiah O'Brien is an example of a maritime property in San Francisco.

By its tenth year, 1976, the National Register listed 46 shipwrecks and vessels. In 1985 Congress mandated that the National Park Service undertake a survey of historic maritime sites, including military sites, in tandem with the National Trust for Historic Preservation and the maritime preservation community. The program was known as the National Maritime Initiative. Its goal was to establish priorities for the preservation of maritime resources and recommend roles for the federal government and the private sector in addressing those priorities. The program identified eight categories to which the known maritime resources of the United States would be classified. They included: preserved historic vessels, shipwrecks and hulks (those ships not afloat but not submerged entirely); documentation (logs, journals, charts, photos, etc.); aids to navigation (including coast guard stations and life-saving stations), marine sites and structures (wharves; warehouse, waterfronts, docks, canals, etc.); small craft (less than 40 feet long, less than 20 tons of displacement); artifact collections (fine art, tools, woodwork, parts of vessels, etc.); and intangible cultural resources (shipwright and rigging skills, oral traditions, folklore, etc.).

=== Traditional cultural properties ===
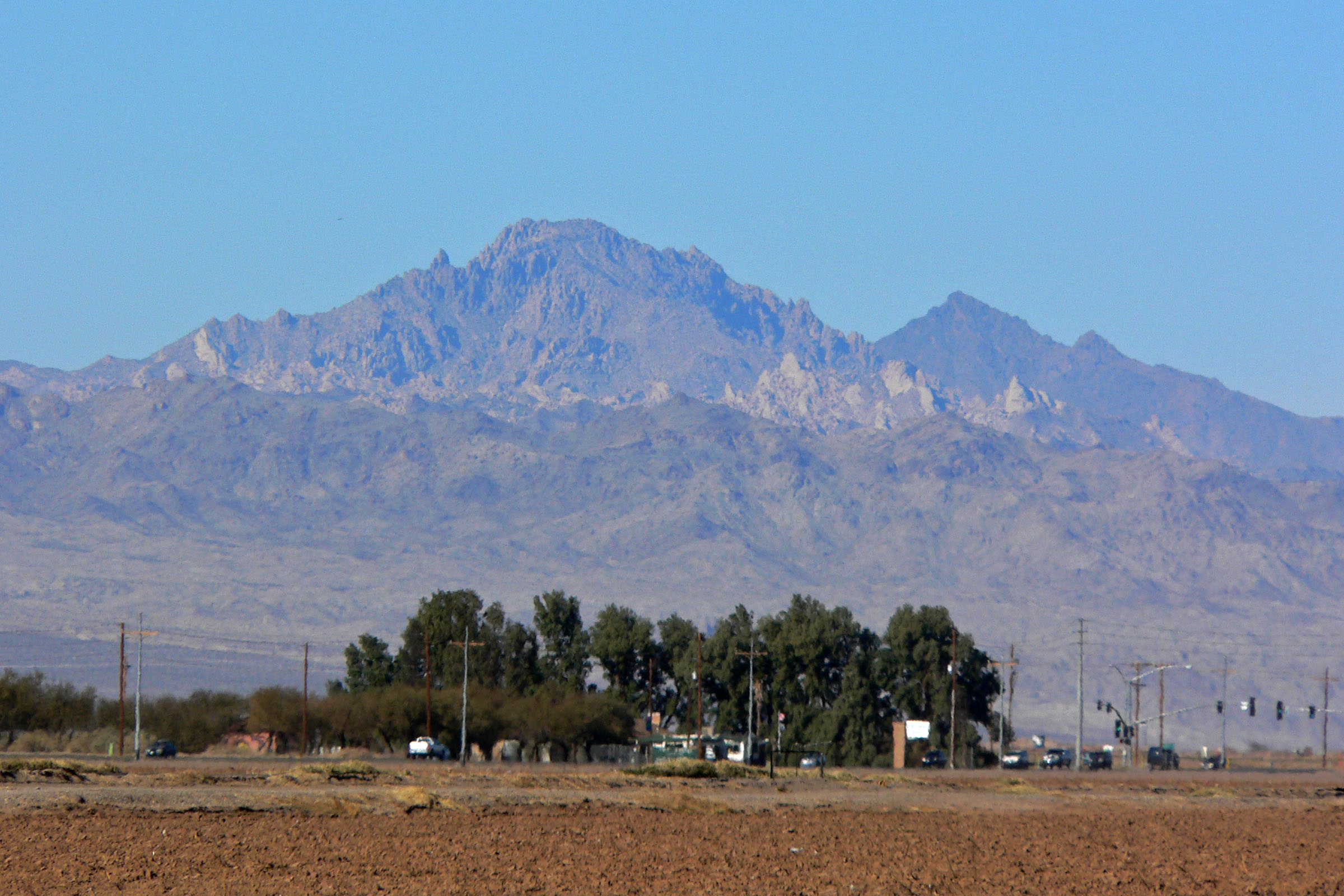
Spirit Mountain in Nevada is an example of a traditional cultural property.

1992 amendments to the NHPA allowed for a new designation of property type, that of the traditional cultural property (TCP). The amendments established that properties affiliated with traditional religious and cultural importance to a distinct cultural group, such as a Native American tribe or Native Hawaiian group, were eligible for the National Register. TCPs include built or natural locations, areas, or features considered sacred or culturally significant by a group or people.

TCPs are closely associated with indigenous cultures; Native Americans and Native Hawaiians are specifically recognized. However, National Parks guidelines explicitly state a site need not be associated with a Native American cultural group to qualify as a TCP for the purposes of the NRHP.

The National Park Service, through the U.S. Department of the Interior, provides specific guidelines for the evaluation and documentation of traditional cultural properties.

== See also ==
- Historic preservation
