= Rhode Island Reds =

Rhode Island Reds has been the name of three sports teams from Rhode Island:

- RI Reds, a current team in the National Premier Soccer League
- Providence Reds, a former team of the Canadian-American Hockey League and American Hockey League which later changed its name to Rhode Island Reds
- Riverpoint Royals, a former team of the New England Collegiate Baseball League which used Rhode Island Reds as its original name

== See also ==
- Rhode Island Red, a breed of domestic chicken
- Rhode Island Red Monument, a historic commemorative sculpture in Little Compton, Rhode Island
