= Henry Knox Trail =

Trail running between New York and Massachusetts, US

External image
- https://www.hmdb.org/PhotoFullSize.asp?PhotoID=555508

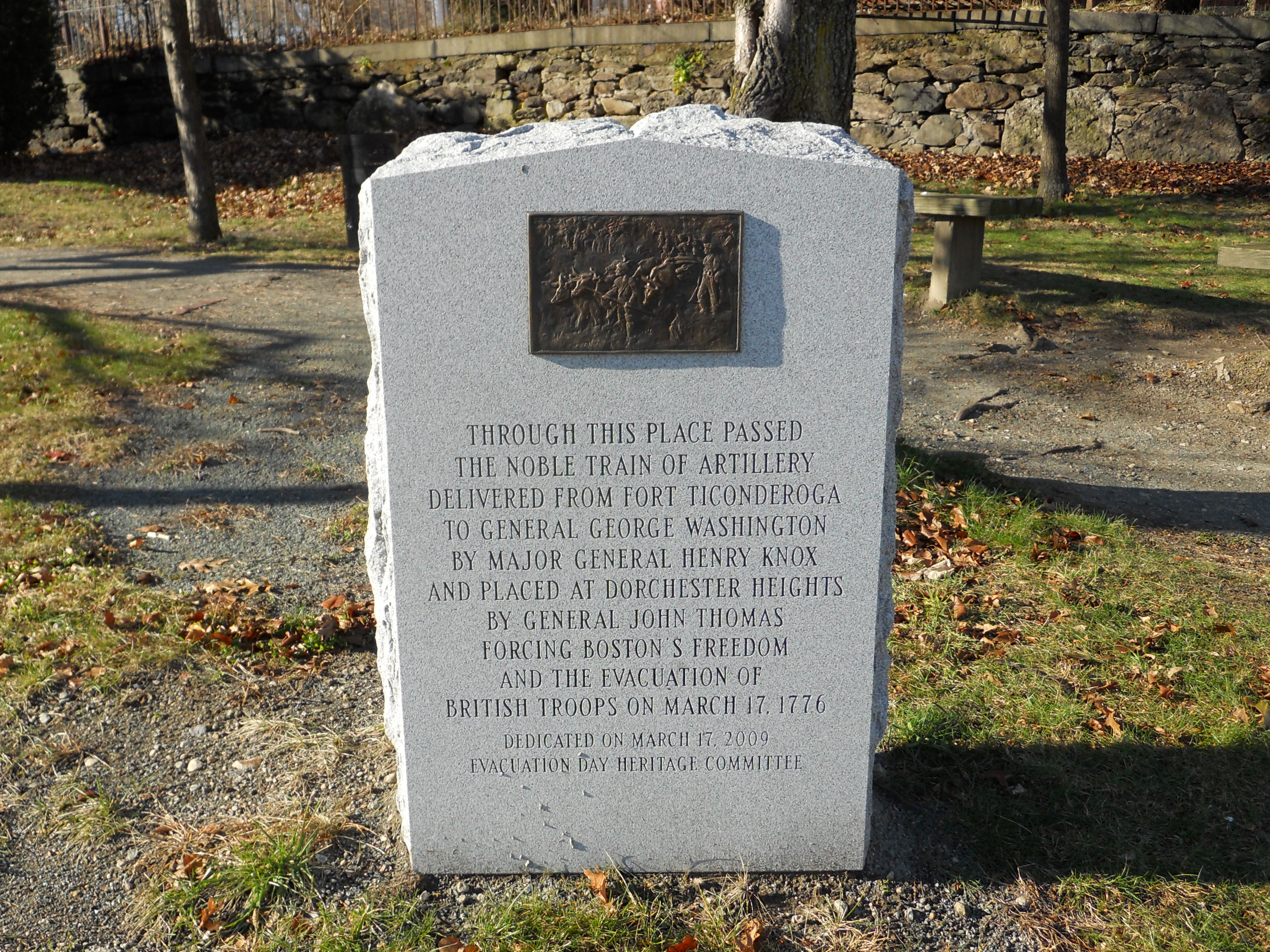
Marker in Roxbury, Boston, Massachusetts, the first marker added to the Henry Knox Trail since its establishment in 1926–27. The marker pictured was dedicated March 17, 2009, the 233rd anniversary of the end of the siege of Boston, known as Evacuation Day in Massachusetts.

The Henry Knox Trail, also known as the Knox Cannon Trail, is a network of roads and paths which traces the route of Colonel Henry Knox's "noble train of artillery" from Crown Point to the Continental Army camp outside Boston, Massachusetts, early in the American Revolutionary War.

== History ==
Knox was commissioned by Continental Army commander George Washington in 1775 to transport 59 cannons from captured forts on Lake Champlain—30 from Fort Ticonderoga and 29 from Crown Point—to the army camp outside Boston to aid the war effort there against British forces. They included 43 heavy brass and iron cannons, six cohorns, eight mortars, and two howitzers. Knox used sledges pulled by teams of oxen to haul these cannons, many weighing over a ton, crossing an icy Lake George in mid-winter. He proceeded to travel through rural New York and the snow-covered Berkshire Mountains of Massachusetts, finally arriving to the aid of the beleaguered Continental Army in January 1776.

== Marker placement ==
In 1926, the 150th anniversary of Knox's march, the states of New York and Massachusetts began installing commemorative plaques at 56 locations which trace the route that the expedition passed through. The work was completed in 1927. The New York markers' bronze reliefs were designed by Henry James Albright, and the Massachusetts reliefs by Henry L. Norton.

In 1975, the marker locations between Kinderhook, New York, and Alford, Massachusetts, were updated after new research confirmed theories originally advanced by North Egremont, Massachusetts, postmaster Joseph Elliott, which found that Knox did not pass through Claverack, New York. A new marker was added to the trail at Roxbury Heritage State Park in Boston in 2009, adjacent to a house owned by General John Thomas, who guided the weapons received from Knox to their final placement on Dorchester Heights overlooking Boston.

== Table of Knox Trail Markers ==
Marker #	Year installed	Title	Address	Picture
NY-0		Crown Point	21 Grandview Dr, Crown Point, NY 12928	Crown Point
NY-1		Fort Ticonderoga (located inside the Fort)	102 Fort Ti Rd, Ticonderoga, NY 12883	Fort Ticonderoga
NY-2		Fort Ticonderoga Marker #2	102 Fort Ti Rd (Sandy Redoubt South Entrance to Park), Ticonderoga, NY 12883	Fort Ticonderoga
NY-3		Ticonderoga	137 Montcalm St, Ticonderoga, NY 12883	Ticonderoga
NY-4		Lake George	651 Black Point Rd, Ticonderoga, NY 12883	Lake George
NY-5		Sabbath Day Point	44 Sabbath Day Point Rd, Silver Bay, NY 12874	
NY-6		Bolton Landing	19 Rogers Memorial Park Rd, Bolton Landing, NY 12814	Bolton Landing
NY-7		Lake George Battlefield	75 Fort George Rd, Lake George, NY 12845 (43°25'04.4"N, 73°42'25.9"W)	Lake George Battlefield
NY-8		Bloody Brook	1716 State Route 9, Lake George, NY 12845	Bloody Brook
NY-9		Glens Falls	626 Glen St, Queensbury, NY 12804	Glens Falls
NY-10		Hudson Falls	220 Main St, Hudson Falls, NY 12839	
NY-11		Fort Edward	219 Broadway, Fort Edward, NY 12828	
NY-12		Fort Miller	1061 State Route 4, Greenwich, NY 12834	
NY-13		Northumberland	107 Starks Knob Rd, Schuylerville, NY 12871	
NY-14		Schuylerville	2 Broad St, Schuylerville, NY 12871	
		Ensign House	513 Saratoga County Veterans Memorial Highway, Stillwater, NY 12170	
NY-15		Bemis Heights	1173 Old Route 32, Stillwater, NY 12170	
NY-16		Stillwater	75 Hudson Ave, Stillwater, NY 12170	
NY-17		Mechanicville	6 S Main St, Mechanicville, NY 12118	
NY-18		Waterford	55 1st St, Waterford, NY 12188	
NY-19		Klaus' Ferry	1258 New Loudon Rd, Cohoes, NY 12047	
NY-20		Latham	206 Old Loudon Rd, Latham, NY 12110	
NY-21		Albany	350 Northern Blvd, Albany, NY 12204	
NY-22		Albany Riverside Park	191 Broadway, Albany, NY 12202	
NY-23		Rensselaer	30 Aiken Ave, Rensselaer, NY 12144	
NY-24		East Greenbush	688 Columbia Tpke, East Greenbush, NY 12061	
NY-25		Schodack	1972 Route 9, Castleton on Hudson, NY 12033	
NY-26		Kinderhook	1 Hudson St, Kinderhook, NY 12106	
NY-27		West Ghent	6 Snyder Rd, Ghent, NY 12075	
NY-28		Claverack	1202 Harlemville Rd, Ghent, NY 12075	
NY-29		Old Nobletown	40 Nobletown Rd, Hillsdale, NY 12529	
NY-30 / MA-1		Alford, MA	MA-71 179 Green River Valley Rd.	
MA-2		North Egremont, MA	223 Egremont Plain Rd.	
MA-3		Great Barrington, MA	Intersection of Route 23 and Route 7	
MA-4		Monterey, MA	Route 23	
		Otis, MA	Route 23	
MA-5		Blandford, MA	Route 23 & North Blandford Rd., Blandford, MA 01008	
MA-6		Russell, MA	Intersection of General Knox Road and South Quarter Road	
MA-7		Westfield, MA	Main Street at N 42° 07.252; W 072° 44.892	
MA-8		West Springfield, MA	Route 20	
MA-9		Springfield, MA	Boston Post Rd. (State Street)	
MA-10		Wilbraham, MA	Route 20 & Main Street	
MA-11		Palmer, MA	1 Wilbraham Street	
MA-12		Warren, MA	Route 67 (Main St.) at the intersection with Washington St.	
MA-13		Brookfield, MA	State Route 9 at the intersection with State Route 148	
MA-14		Spencer, MA	next to 117 Main St.	
MA-15		Leicester, MA	1136 Main St., in front of the Leicester Public Library and Museum	
MA-16		Worcester, MA	Main Street at Lincoln Square	
MA-17		Shrewsbury, MA	Main St. at Shrewsbury Common	
MA-18		Northborough, MA	63 Main Street (in front of Town Hall)	
MA-19		Marlborough, MA		
MA-20		Southborough, MA	28 Main Street, Southborough, MA	
MA-21		Framingham, MA		
MA-23		Wayland, MA	Old Connecticut Path and Cochituate Rd.	
MA-24		Weston, MA	Boston Post Rd. and Town House Rd.	
MA-25		Waltham, MA	Route 20 (Weston St.) & Main Street	
MA-26		Watertown	481 Mt Auburn St, Watertown, MA 02472	
MA-27		Cambridge	42° 22.593′ N, 71° 7.313′ W, Corner of Garden St and Mason St on the Cambridge Common, Cambridge, MA	
MA-27.5		Roxbury, MA	Malcolm X Blvd & Roxbury Street	
MA-28		South Boston	Thomas Park, Dorchester Heights	

== Photo gallery ==
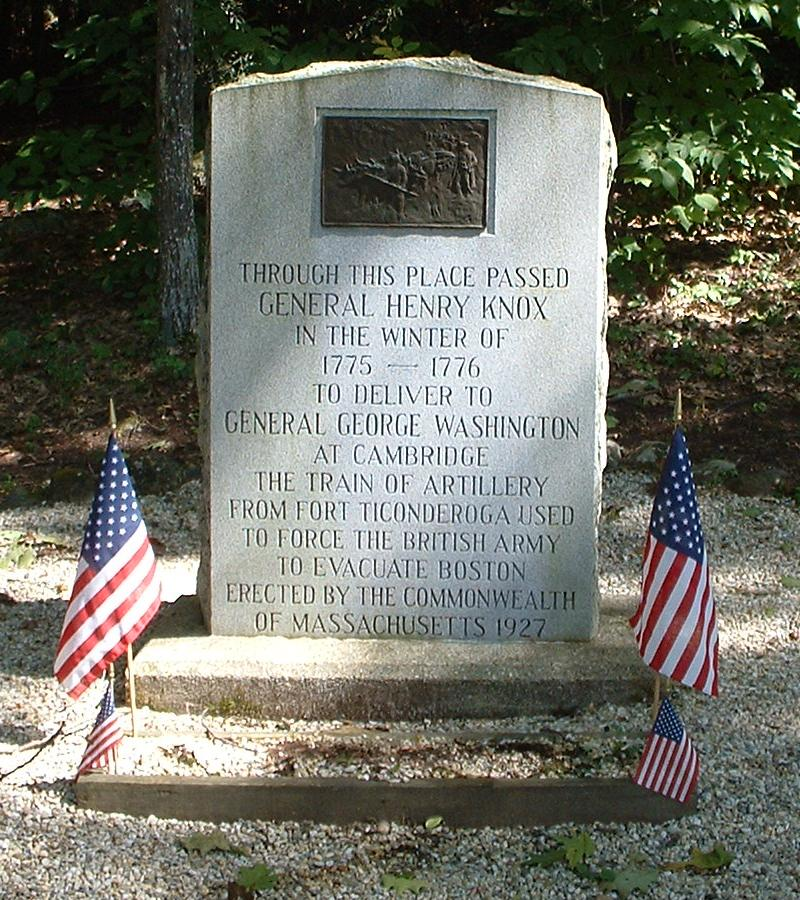
Otis-Knox Trail Stone

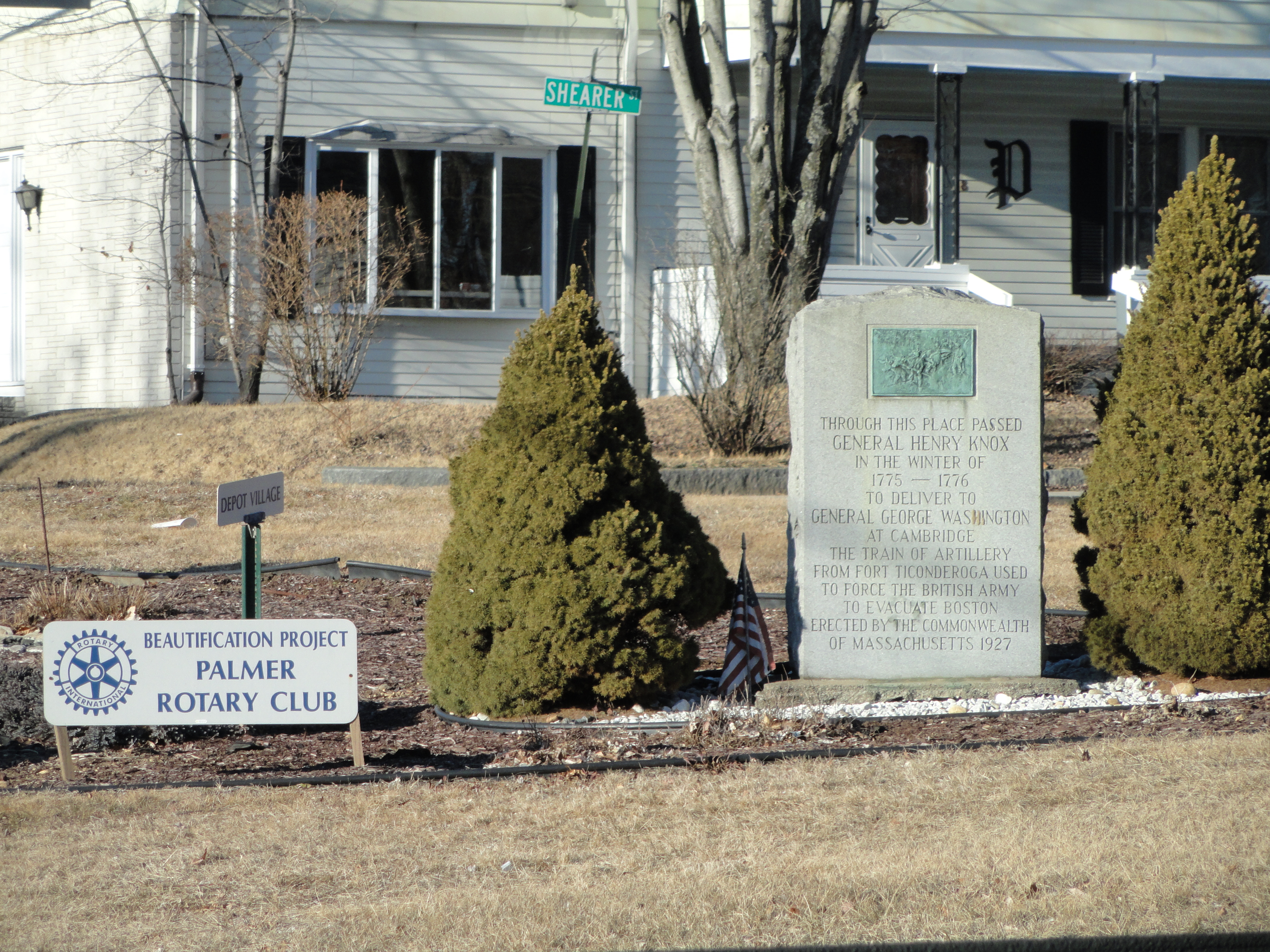
General Henry Knox Trail (Palmer, Massachusetts)

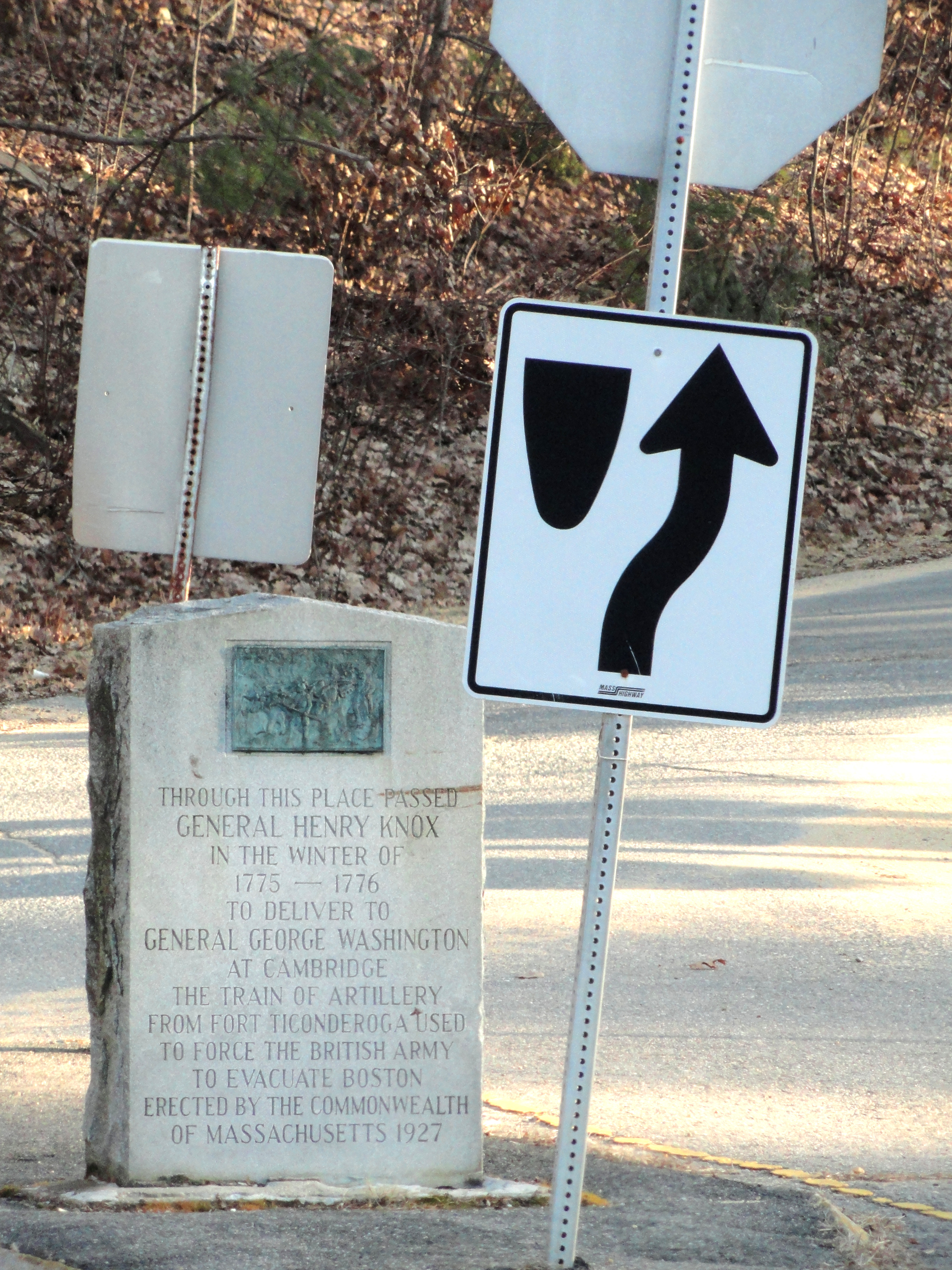
General Henry Knox Trail (Warren, Massachusetts)

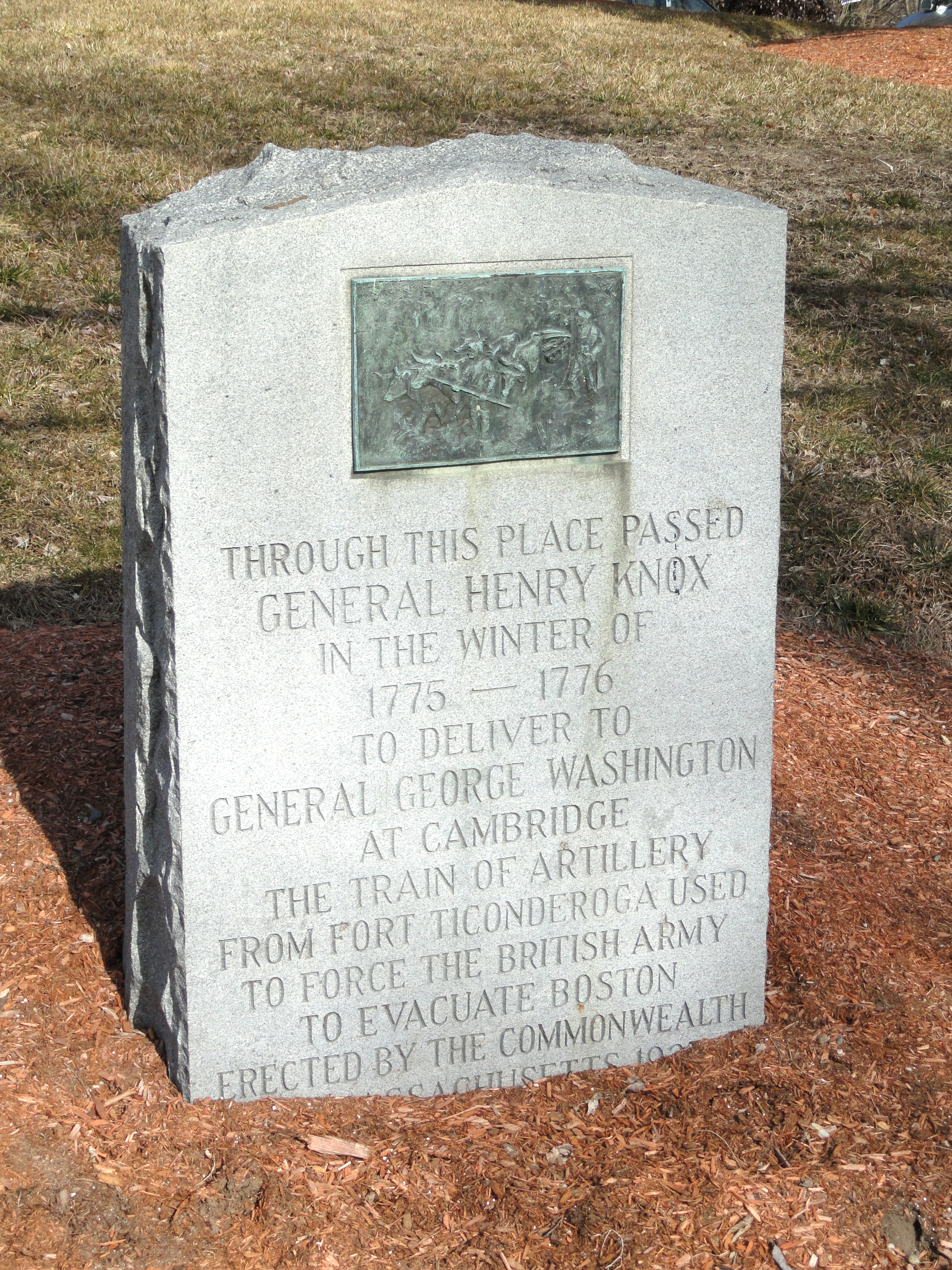
General Henry Knox Trail (Northborough, Massachusetts)

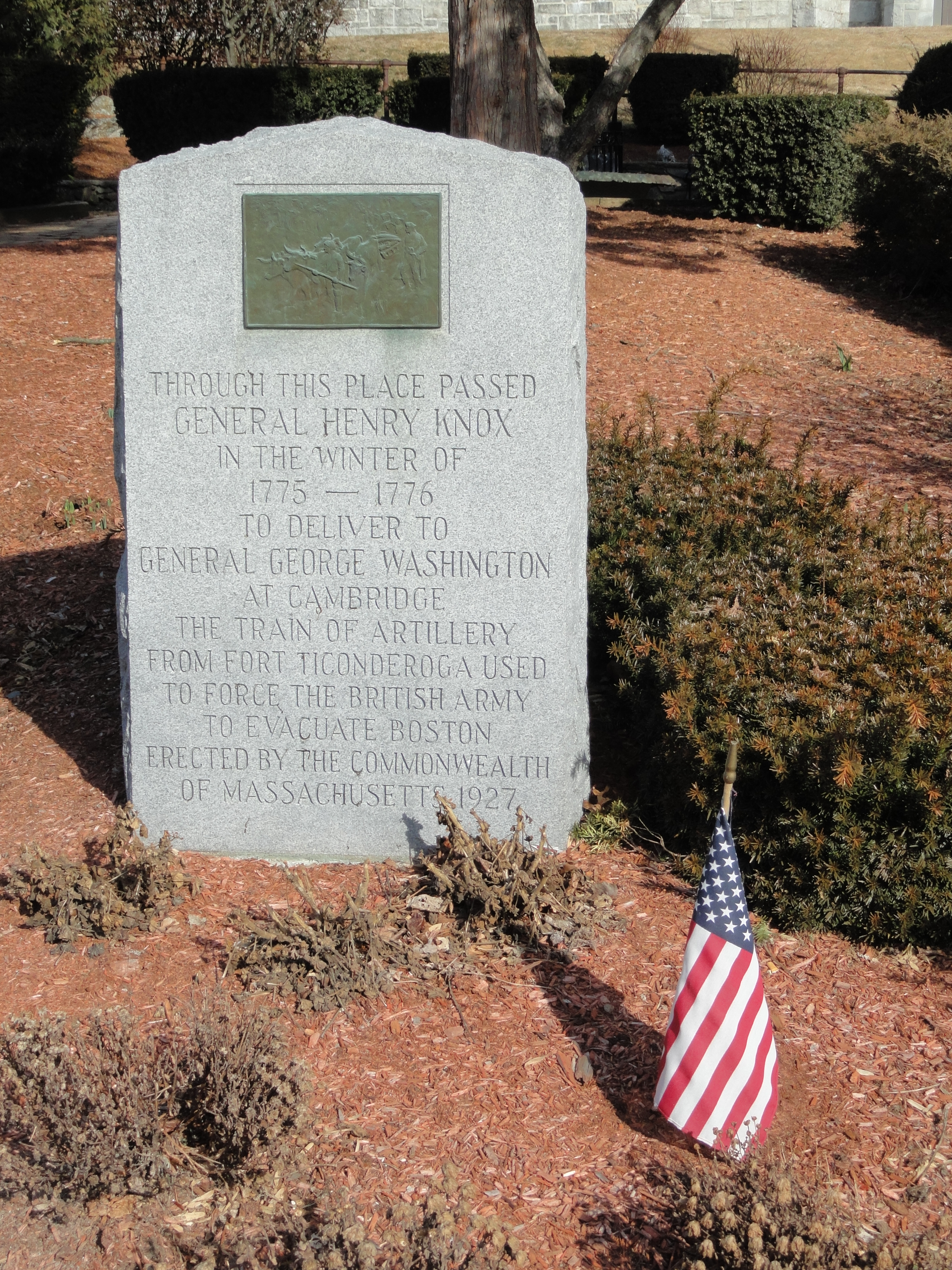
General Henry Knox Trail (Marlborough, Massachusetts)

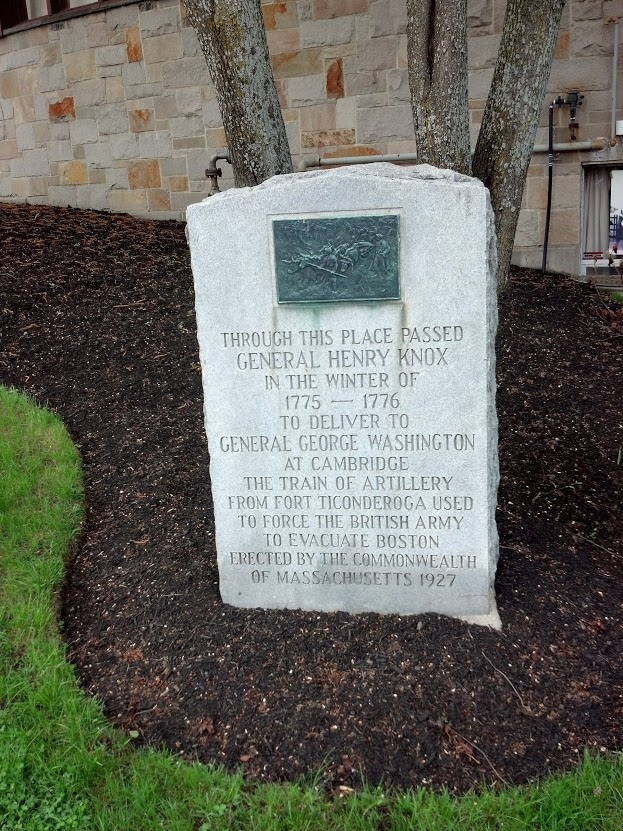
General Henry Knox Trail (Framingham, Massachusetts)

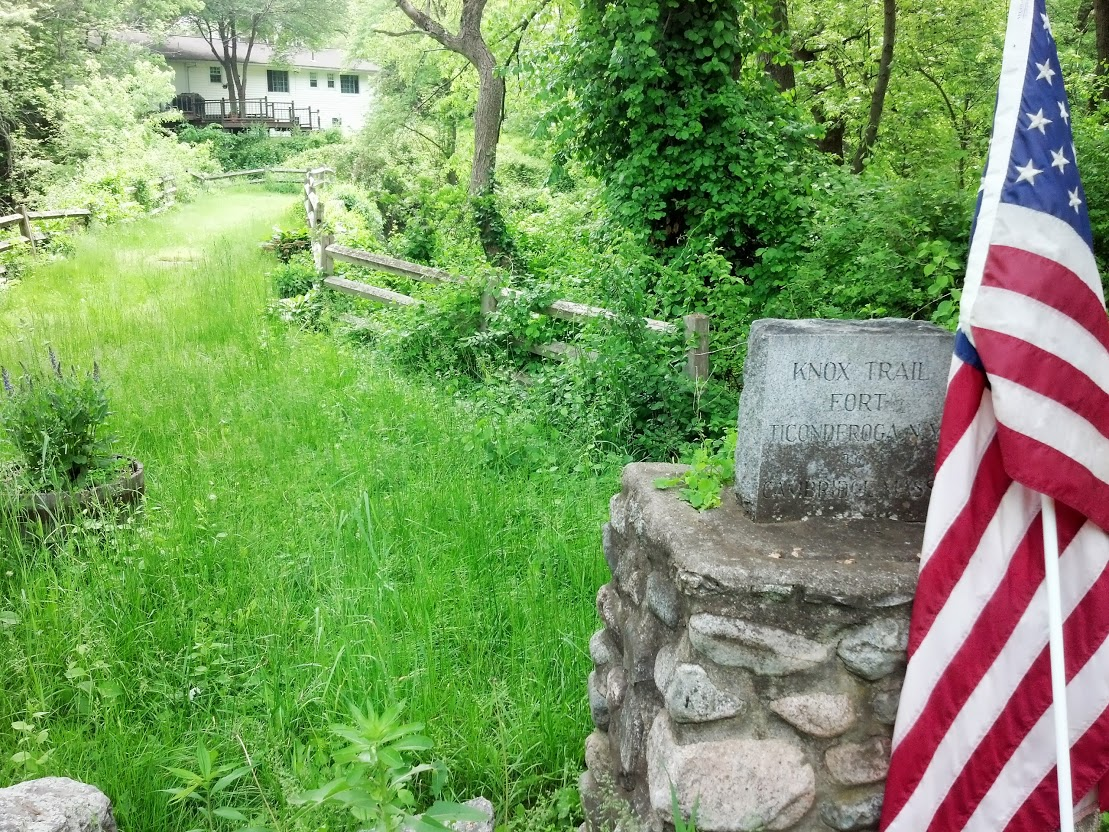
General Henry Knox Trail (Framingham/Wayland border, Massachusetts)

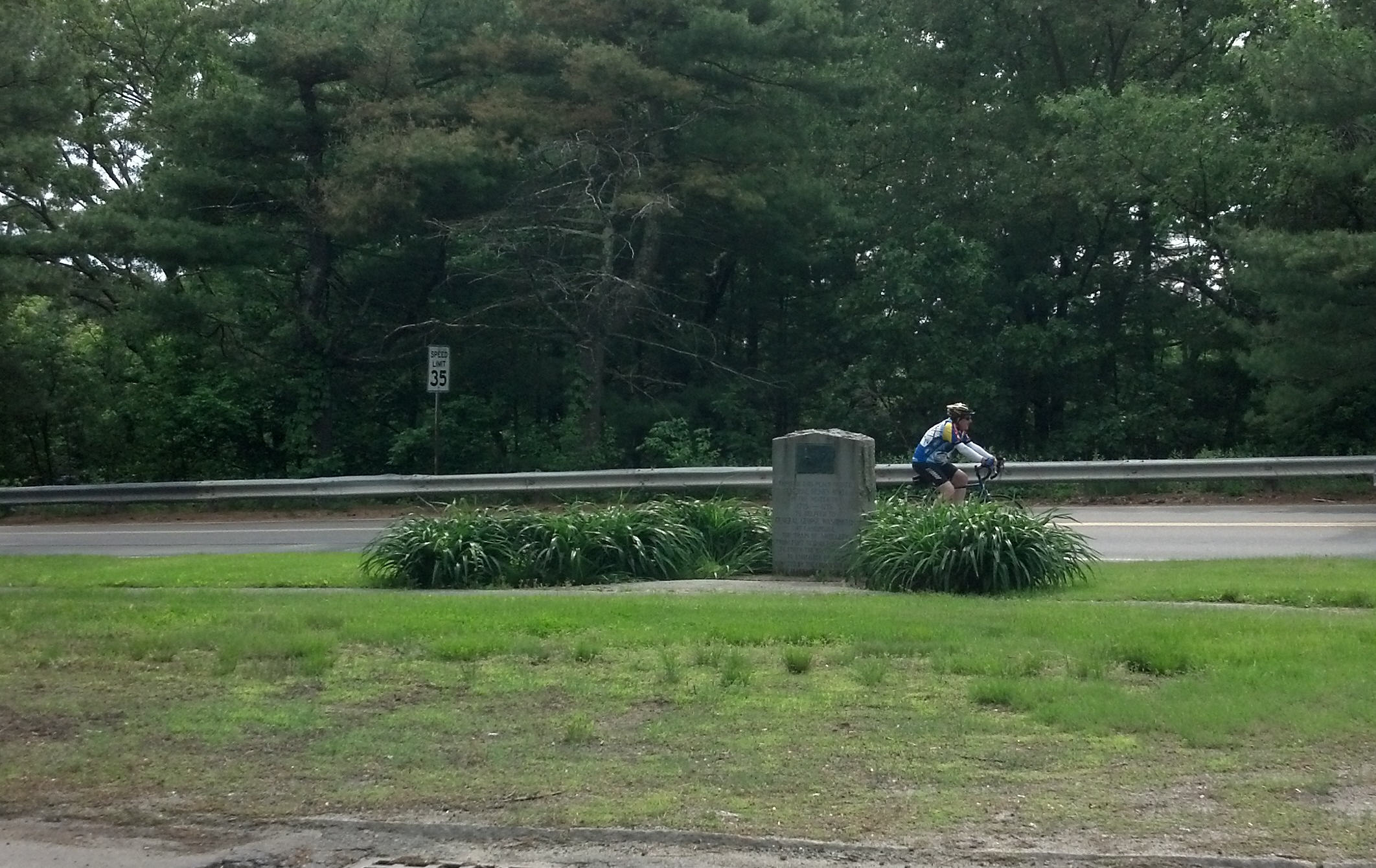
General Henry Knox Trail (Wayland, Massachusetts)

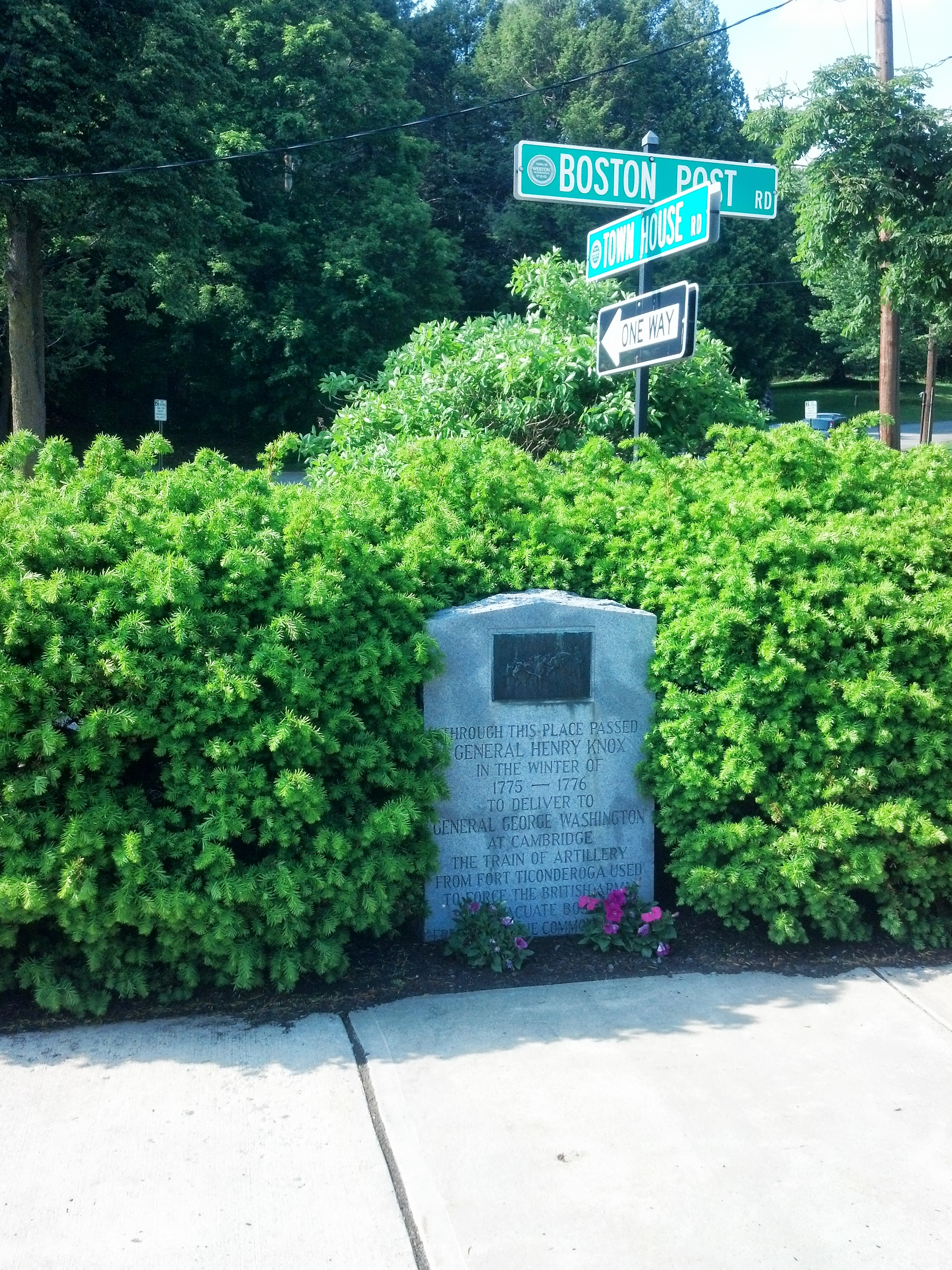
General Henry Knox Trail (Weston, Massachusetts)

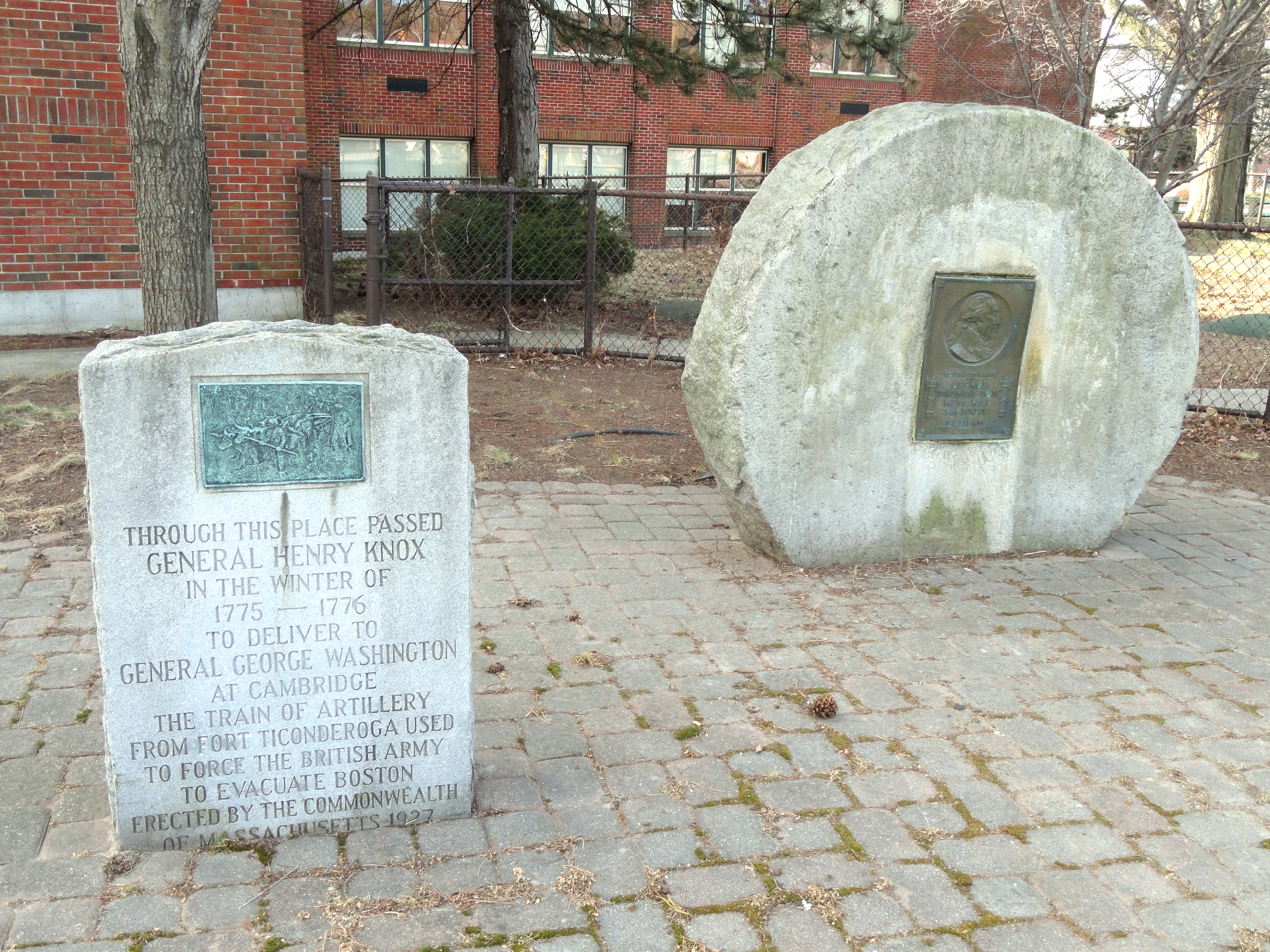
General Henry Knox Trail and George Washington Memorial Highway (Waltham, Massachusetts)

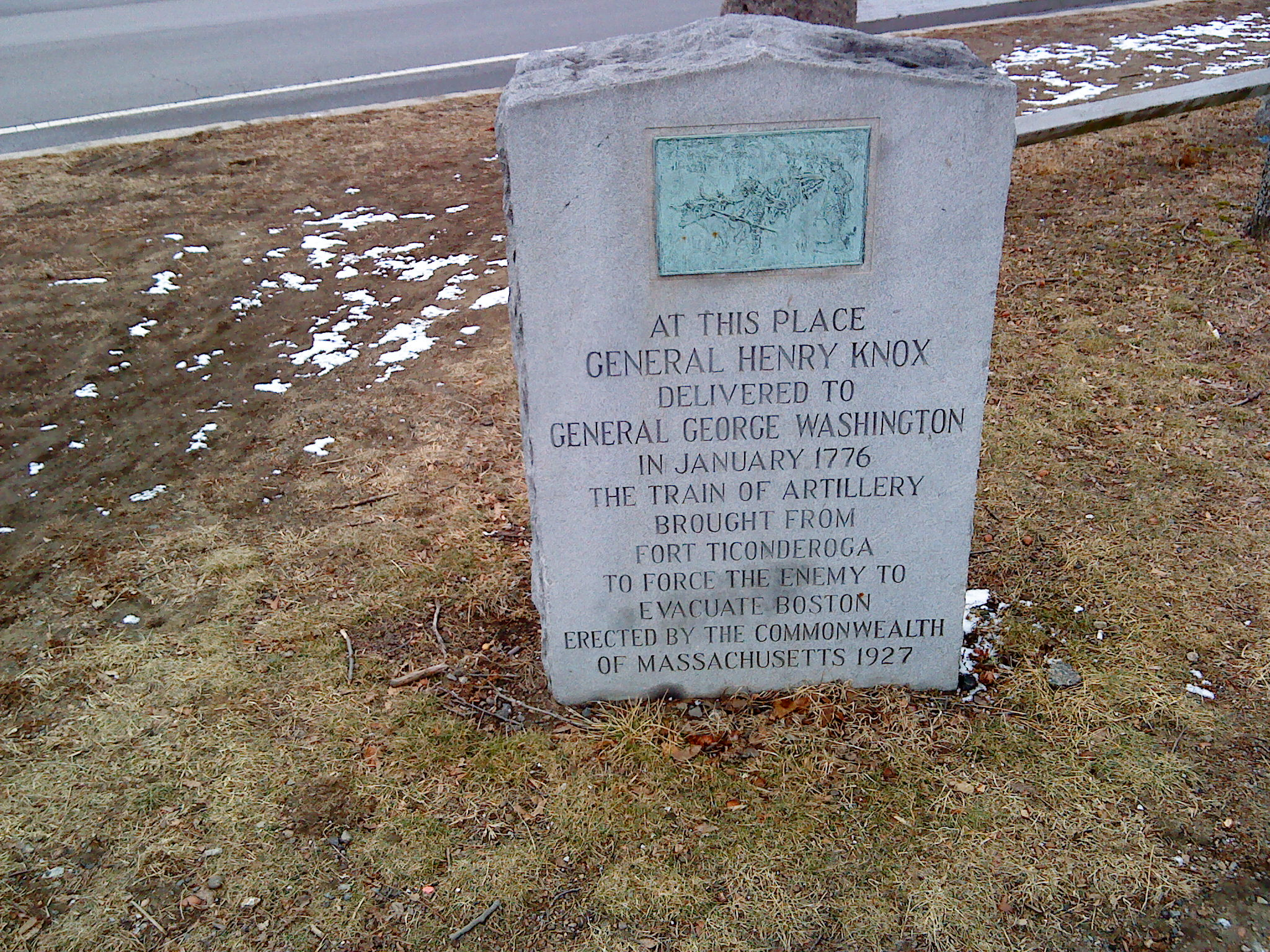
General Henry Knox Trail (Cambridge, Massachusetts)
