= Noble train of artillery =

1775–76 logistical feat during the American Revolutionary War

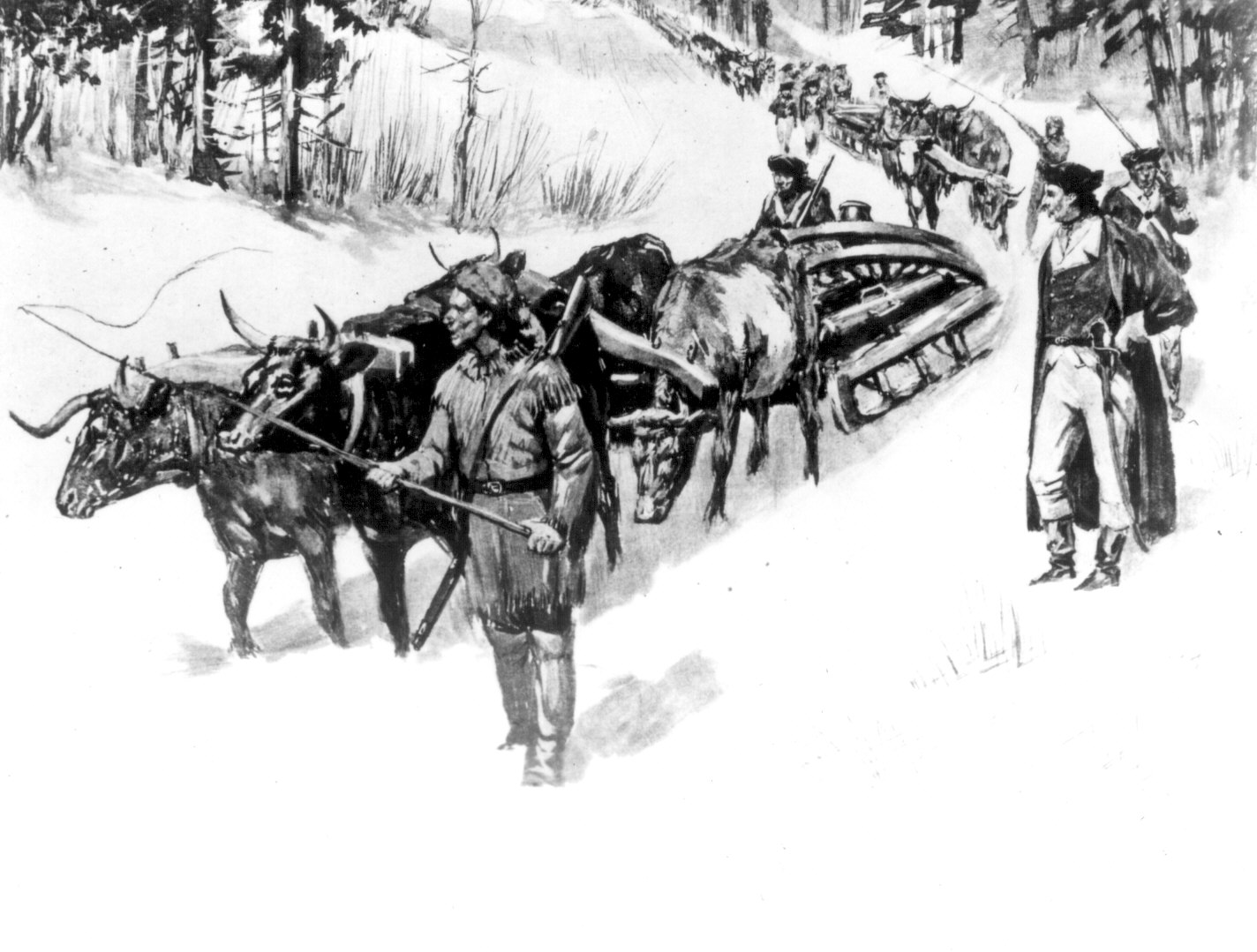
- An ox team hauling Ticonderoga's guns
- Date: November 17, 1775 – January 25, 1776 (70 days)
- Location: British provinces of New York and Massachusetts Bay
- Participants: Colonel Henry Knox
- Outcome: Fortification of Dorchester Heights

The noble train of artillery, also known as the Knox Expedition, was an expedition led by Continental Army Colonel Henry Knox to transport heavy weaponry that had been captured at Fort Ticonderoga to the Continental Army camps outside Boston during the winter of 1775–76. Knox went to Ticonderoga in November 1775 and moved 60 tons of cannon and other armaments over the course of three winter months by boat, horse, ox-drawn sledges, and manpower along poor-quality roads, across two semi-frozen rivers, and through the forests and swamps of the lightly inhabited Berkshires to the Boston area, covering approximately 300 miles (500 km). Historian Victor Brooks has called Knox's exploit "one of the most stupendous feats of logistics" of the American Revolutionary War. The route he took is now known as the Henry Knox Trail.

== Background ==
The American Revolutionary War erupted with the Battles of Lexington and Concord in April 1775. Benedict Arnold was a militia leader from Connecticut who had arrived with his unit in support of the siege of Boston; he proposed to the Massachusetts Committee of Safety that Fort Ticonderoga on Lake Champlain in the Province of New York be captured from its small British garrison. One reason that he gave to justify the move was the presence of heavy weaponry at Ticonderoga. On May 3, the committee gave Arnold a Massachusetts colonel's commission and authorized the operation.

The idea to capture Ticonderoga had also been raised to Ethan Allen and the Green Mountain Boys in the disputed New Hampshire Grants territory in Vermont. Allen and Arnold joined forces, and a force of 83 men captured the fort without a fight on May 10. The next day, a detachment captured the nearby Fort Crown Point, again without combat. Arnold began to inventory the two forts for usable military equipment, but he was hampered by a lack of resources and conflict over command of the forts, first with Allen and then with a Connecticut militia company sent to hold the fort in June. He eventually abandoned the idea of transporting the armaments to Boston and resigned his commission.

== Expedition planning ==
In July 1775, George Washington assumed command of the forces outside Boston, and one of the significant problems which he identified in the nascent Continental Army was a lack of heavy weaponry, which made offensive operations virtually impossible. It is not known who proposed the operation to retrieve the Ticonderoga armament, but historians tend to credit either Arnold or Henry Knox with giving Washington the idea; regardless, Washington chose Knox for the job.

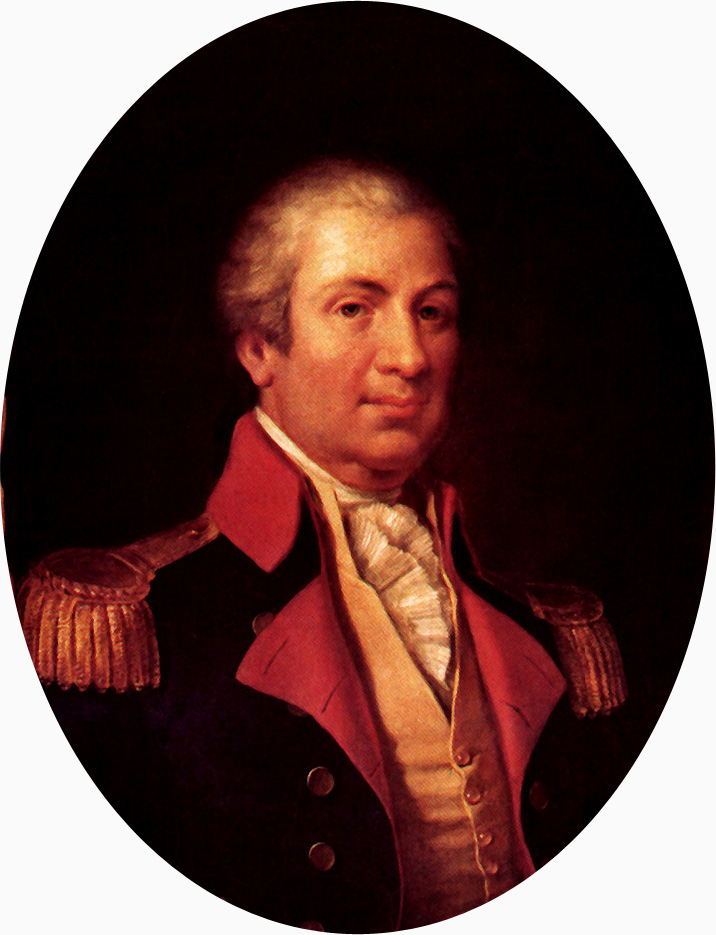
Henry Knox later in life

Knox was a 25-year-old bookseller with an interest in military matters who served in the Massachusetts militia, and he had become good friends with Washington on his arrival at Boston. When Washington gave him the assignment, he wrote "no trouble or expense must be spared to obtain them." On November 16 Washington issued orders to Knox to retrieve the cannons and authorized £1000 for the purpose, and he wrote General Philip Schuyler asking him to assist Knox in the endeavor. Washington's call for the weapons was echoed by the Second Continental Congress, and they issued Knox a colonel's commission in November—although it did not reach him until he returned from the expedition.

Knox departed Washington's camp on November 17 and traveled to New York City for supplies, reaching Ticonderoga on December 5. He shared a cabin with a young British prisoner named John André at Fort George at the southern end of Lake George. André had been taken prisoner during the Siege of Fort St. Jean and was on his way south to a prison camp. The two were of a similar age and temperament and found much common ground to talk about. The next time they met, however, Knox presided over the court-martial which convicted André and sentenced him to death for his role in Arnold's treason.

== Sources ==
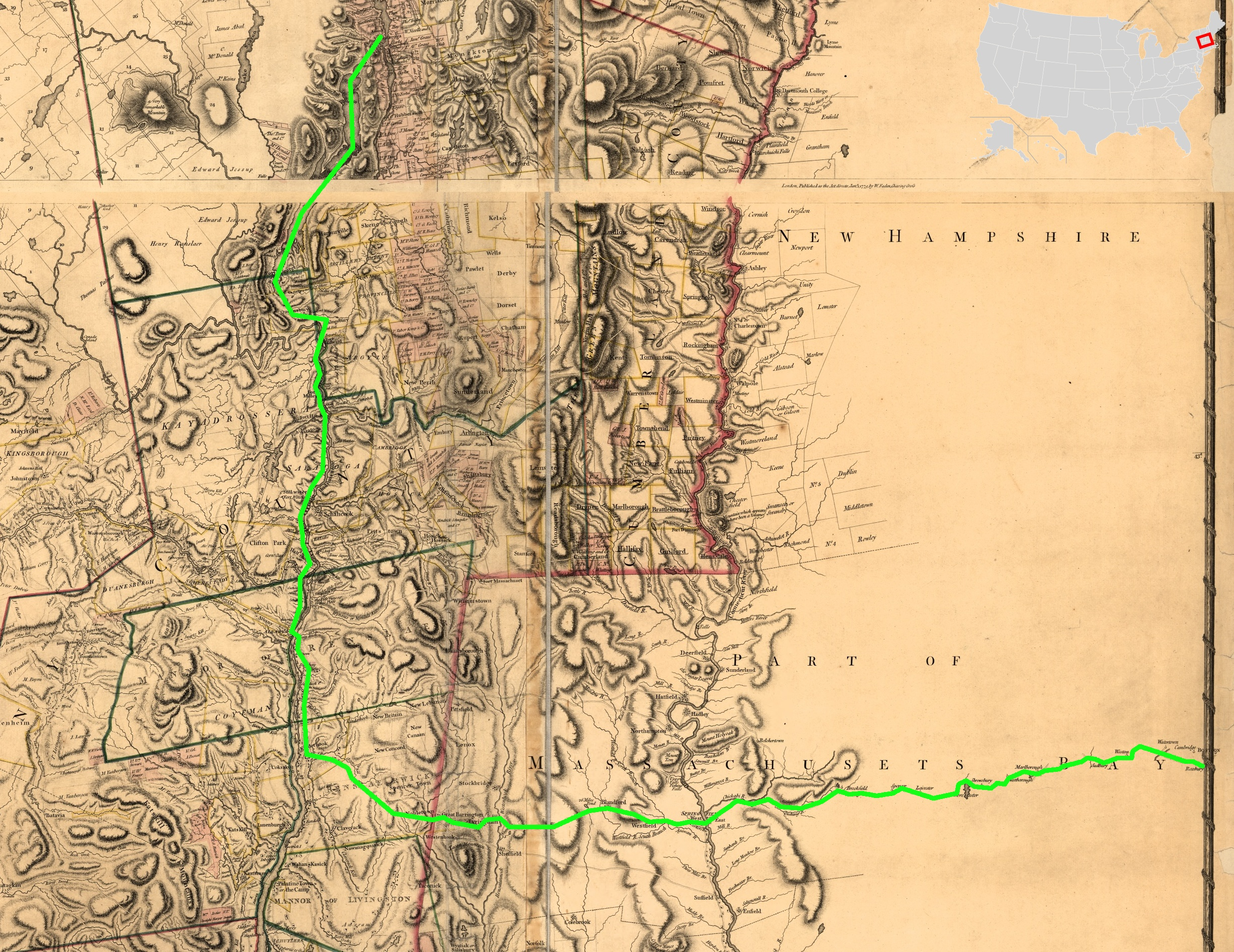
The apparent route of the expedition, overlaid on a 1779 map

Knox's letters and diaries provide the primary sources for much of the daily activity in this journey. His description is detailed for some of the events and dates, but there are also significant gaps, and significant portions of the journey are poorly documented, especially much of the Massachusetts section. Some of these gaps occur because Knox did not write about them and others because pages are missing from the diary. Other sources confirm some of Knox's details or report additional details, but parts of the route are not known with certainty, and modern descriptions of those parts are based on what is known about Massachusetts roads at the time, including the placement of markers for the Henry Knox Trail.

== Albany ==
Upon arrival at Ticonderoga, Knox set about identifying the equipment to take and organizing its transport. He selected 59 pieces of equipment, including cannon ranging in size from 4- to 24-pounders, mortars, and howitzers. He estimated the weight to be transported at 119,000 pounds (about 60 tons or 54 metric tons). The largest pieces were the 24-pounders which were 11 feet (3.4 m) long and estimated to weigh over 5,000 pounds (2,300 kg) each.

The equipment was first carried overland from Ticonderoga to the northern end of Lake George, where most of the train was loaded onto a gundalow (flat-bottomed sailing barge). On December 6 the gundalow set sail for the southern end of the lake, with Knox sailing ahead in a small boat. Ice was already beginning to cover the lake, but the gundalow reached Sabbath Day Point, after grounding once on a submerged rock. They sailed on again the next day, with Knox going ahead. He reached Fort George in good time, but the gundalow did not appear when expected. A boat went to check on its progress and reported that the gundalow had foundered and sunk not far from Sabbath Day Point. This appeared to be a serious setback at first, but Knox's brother William, captain of the gundalow, reported that she had foundered but her gunwales were above the water line, and that she could be bailed out. This was done, the ship was refloated, and the gundalow arrived at the southern end of the lake two days later.

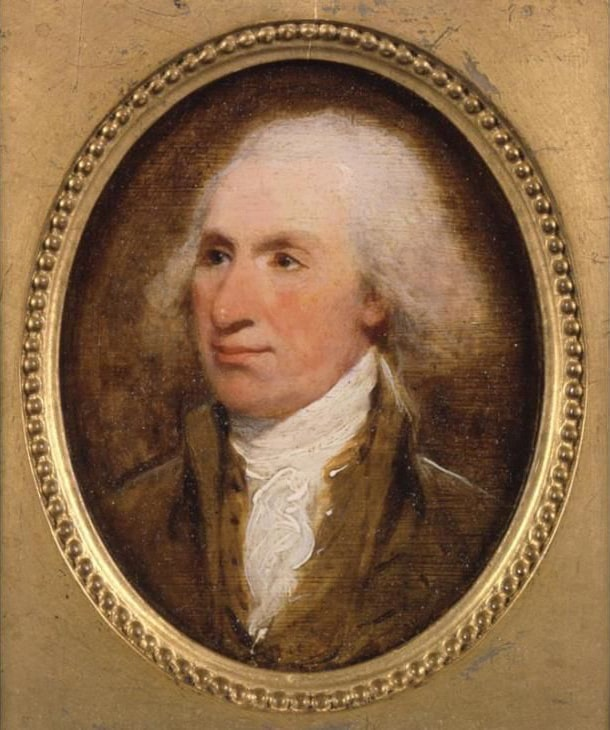
General Philip Schuyler

On December 17 Knox wrote to Washington that he had built "42 exceeding strong sleds, and have provided 80 yoke of oxen to drag them as far as Springfield", and that he hoped "in 16 or 17 days to be able to present your Excellency a noble train of artillery". Although Knox wrote to Washington of oxen, he was unable to procure them at his price and rented horses instead, he wrote in his diary. Most depictions of the journey mistakenly show oxen. He then set out for Albany ahead of the train, crossed the frozen Hudson River at Glens Falls, and proceeded on through Saratoga to reach Lansingburg on Christmas Day. Two feet (60 cm) of snow fell that day, slowing his progress. He reached Albany the next day, again slowed by significant snow on the ground. There he met with General Philip Schuyler, and the two of them worked over the next few days to locate and send north equipment and personnel to assist in moving the train south from Lake George. The snowfall was sufficient to enable sleds to move the train overland, but the river ice was too thin to move it over the Hudson. Knox and his men tried to accelerate the process of thickening the river ice by pouring additional water on top of existing ice. The first of the cannon arrived at Albany by January 4, 1776, but some cannon had crashed through the ice into the river on the way to Albany, and again on crossing the Hudson heading east toward Massachusetts. In every instance, however, the cannon were recovered. On January 9, the last of cannon had crossed the Hudson, and Knox rode ahead to oversee the next stage of the journey.

== Crossing the Berkshires ==
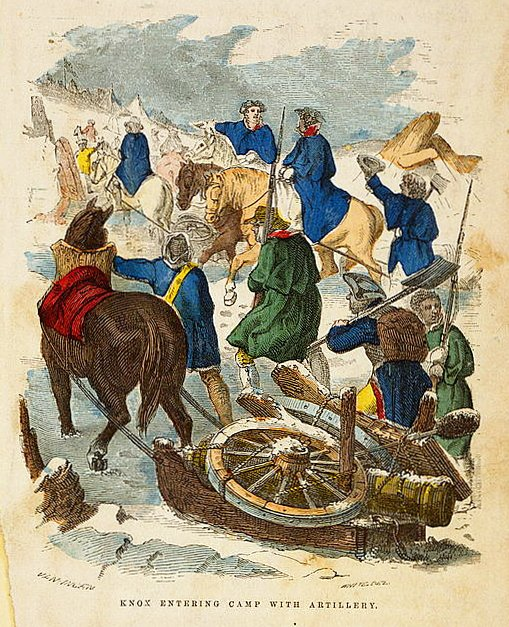
19th-century drawing depicting the arrival of the weapons

Details are sparse concerning the remaining journey because Knox's journal ends on January 12. He reached the vicinity of Claverack, New York, on January 9 and proceeded through the Berkshires, reaching Blandford, Massachusetts, two days later. There the lead crew refused to continue owing to a lack of snow and the upcoming steep descent to the Connecticut River valley, but Knox hired additional oxen and persuaded the crew to go on. As the train moved east, news of it spread and people came out to watch it pass. In Westfield, Knox loaded one of the big guns with powder and fired it to the applause of the assembled crowd.

At Springfield Knox had to hire new work crews, as his New York-based crews wanted to return home. John Adams reported seeing the artillery train pass through Framingham on January 25, and Knox arrived in Cambridge two days later and personally reported to Washington that they had arrived. According to Knox's accounting, he spent £521 on an operation that he had hoped would take two weeks but actually took ten weeks.

== Arrival ==
Washington wanted to end the siege, and he formulated a plan to draw at least some of the British out of Boston once the equipment began to arrive, at which point he would launch an attack on the city across the Charles River. He placed cannons from Ticonderoga at Lechmere's Point and Cobble Hill in Cambridge, and on Lamb's Dam in Roxbury. These batteries opened fire on Boston on the night of March 2, 1776, while preparations were made to fortify the Dorchester Heights from which cannons could threaten both the city and the British fleet in the harbor. Continental Army troops occupied this high ground on the night of March 4.

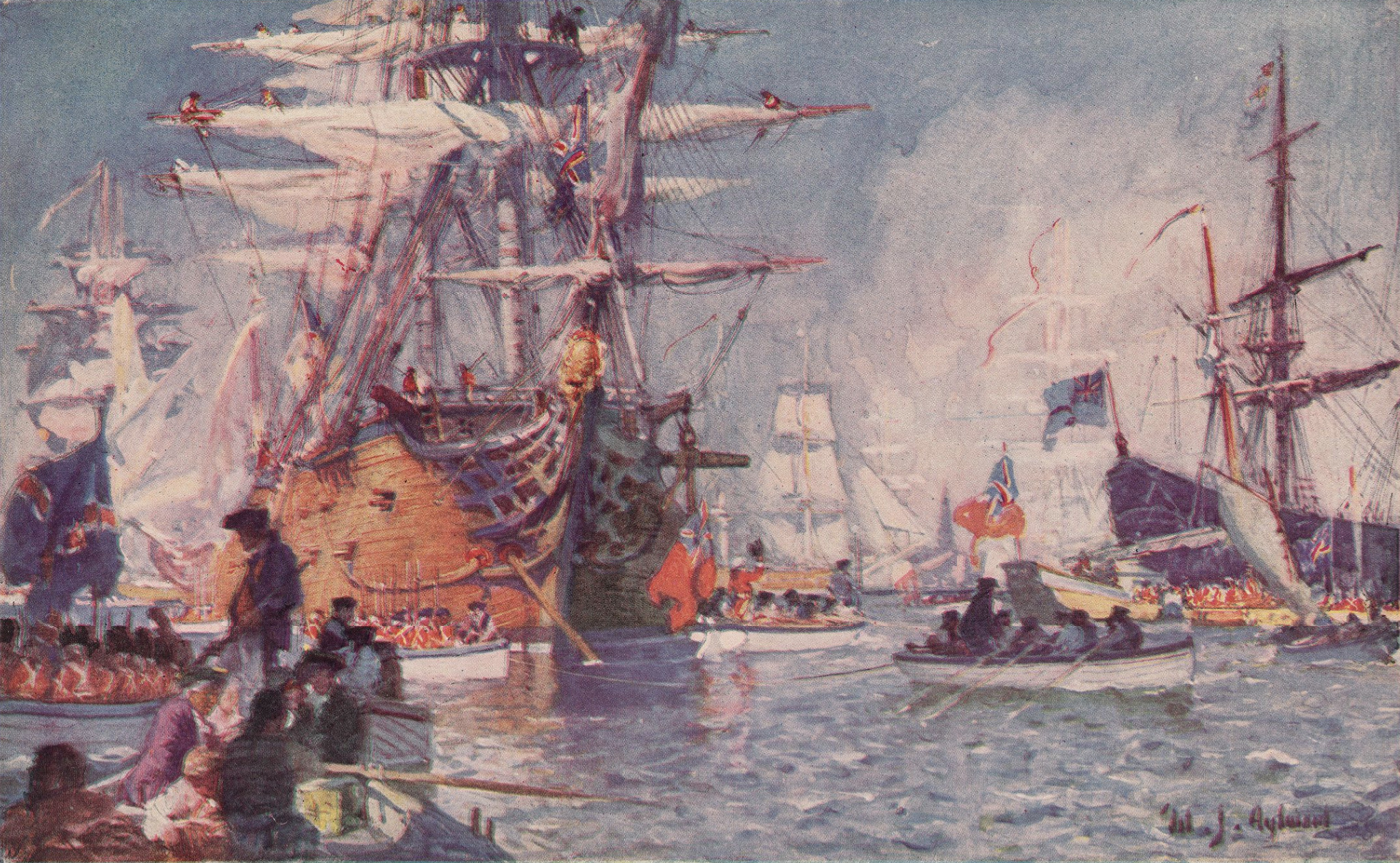
1911 painting of the evacuation of British troops from Boston

British General William Howe first planned to contest this move by assaulting the position, but a snowstorm prevented its execution. After further consideration, he decided instead to withdraw from the city. On March 17, British troops and Loyalist colonists boarded ships and sailed for Halifax, Nova Scotia.

Henry Knox went on to become the chief artillery officer of the Continental Army and later served as the first United States Secretary of War.

== Legacy ==
At the time of the exploit's sesquicentennial (150th anniversary), the State of New York and the Commonwealth of Massachusetts both placed historical markers along the route that Knox was believed to have taken. In 1972, some markers were moved in New York after new information surfaced about the train's movements between Albany and the state boundary. Given the lack of documentation for the Massachusetts portion of the journey, most of the markers there were placed along the route that the train was assumed to have taken, based on what was known about Massachusetts roads of the time.

Fort Knox, an Army post in Kentucky famous as the site of the United States Bullion Depository, was named after Henry Knox.

== Types and numbers of cannon ==
Cannon transported by the train:

- Coehorn (brass)
  - 5 7/10 in: 2
  - 4 1/2 in: 4
- Mortar (brass)
  - 4 1/2 in: 1
- Mortar (iron)
  - 6 1/2 in: 1
  - 10 in: 1
  - 10 1/4 in: 1
  - 13 in: 3
- Cannon (brass)
  - 3-pounder: 8
  - 6-pounder: 3
  - 18-pounder: 1
  - 24-pounder: 1
- Cannon (iron)
  - 6-pounder: 6
  - 9-pounder: 4
  - 12-pounder: 10
  - 18-pounder: 11
- Howitzer (iron)
  - 8 in: 1
  - 8 1/2 in: 1

== See also ==
- Hannibal's crossing of the Alps
