= Henry L. Norton =

American sculptor

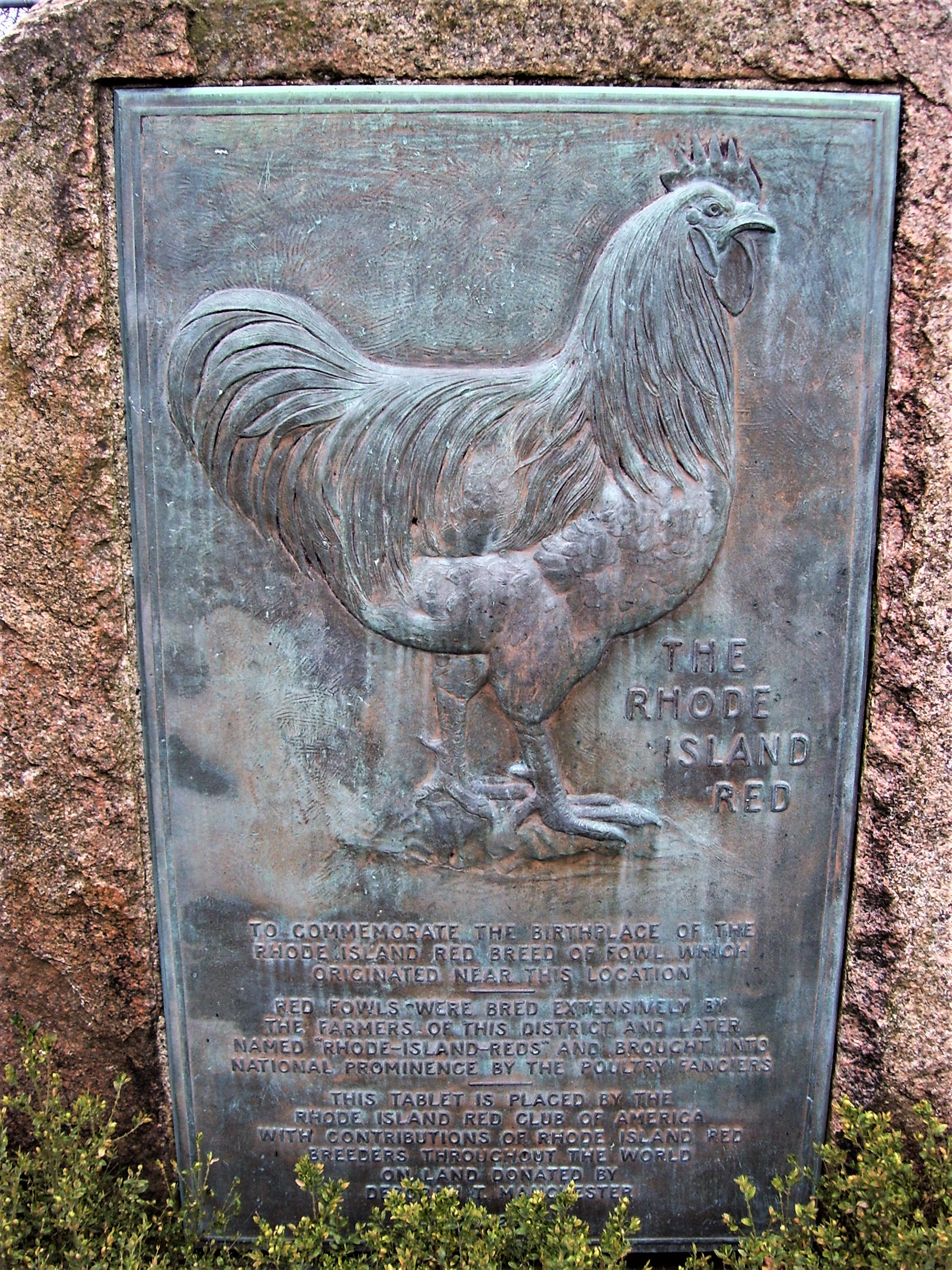
Rhode Island Red Monument, 1925

Henry L. Norton (1873-1932) was an American sculptor and manufacturer of bronze tablets active in New England.

Norton was born in North Canaan, Connecticut, and later lived in West Springfield, Boston, and Winthrop, Massachusetts. During World War I, he served with the Canadian Army and was wounded seven times. Subsequently, he ran a bronze tablet foundry in Boston.

== Selected works ==
- Rhode Island Red Monument, 1925
- Henry Knox Trail markers, Massachusetts, 1927
- War Memorial, Westford, Massachusetts
- Monument to All Wars, Ellington, Connecticut
