= Henry James Albright =

American painter

- Born: Henry James Albright; July 16, 1887; Albany, New York
- Died: January 22, 1951 (aged 63); Glenmont, New York
- Citizenship: America
- Occupations: painter; sculptor; potter

Henry James Albright (July 16, 1887 – January 22, 1951) was an American impressionist painter, sculptor, and potter active in Albany, New York.

Albright studied with L. Birge Harrison and John F. Carlson, and lived for a time in Venice. He was a friend of Gustav Stickley, and a member of the Buffalo Salon of Independent Artists, Albany Artist Group, and the New Haven Paint and Clay Club. His ceramics appeared in the Georg Jensen catalog as Samara Ware.

Albright's portrait of President Grover Cleveland is held in the White House art collection.
