= Rhode Island Red Monument =

- Rhode Island Red
- U.S. National Register of Historic Places
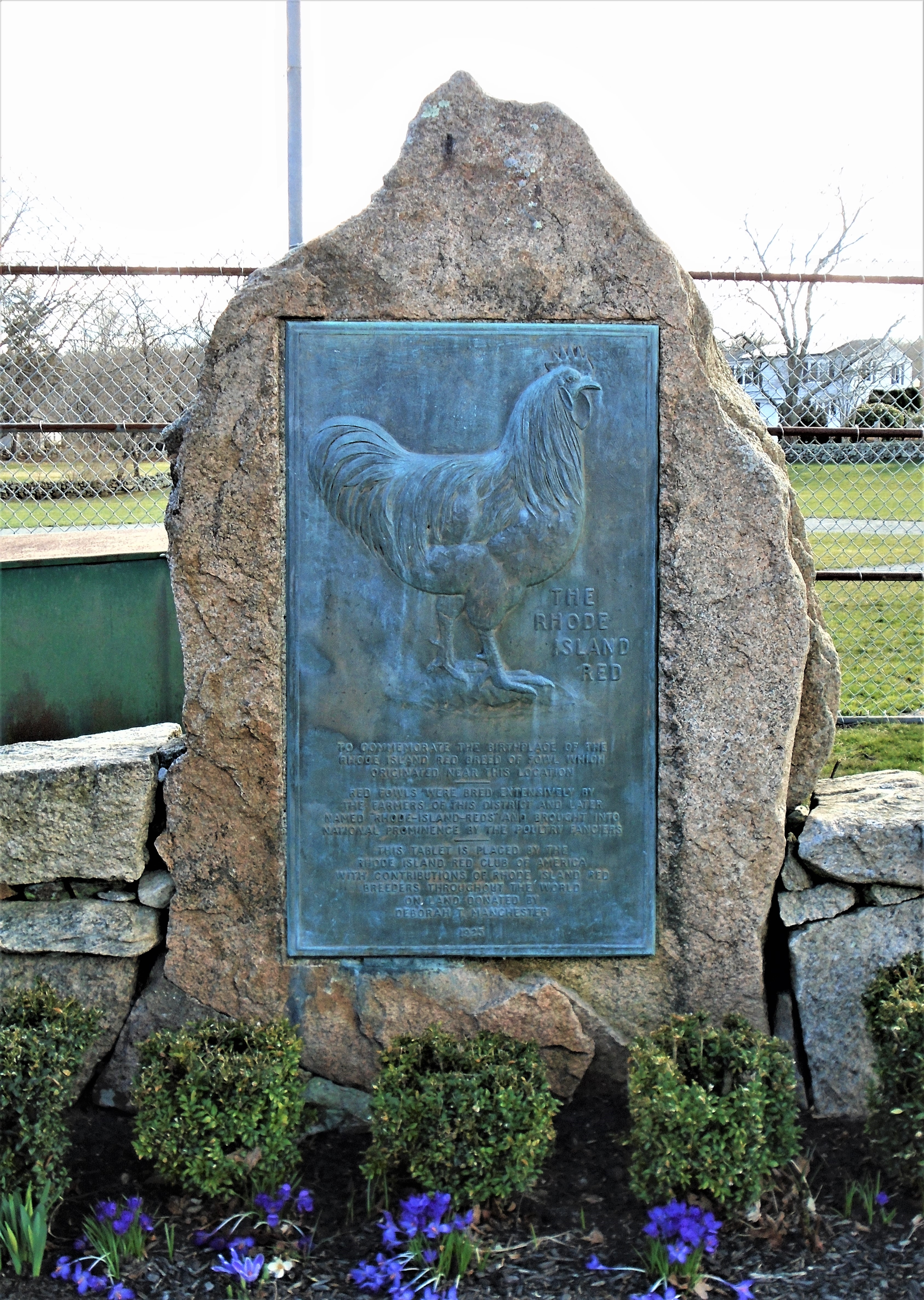
- (2021)

- Location within Rhode Island Location within the United States
- Location: Little Compton, Rhode Island
- Coordinates: 41°33′13″N 71°7′44″W
- Built: 1925
- Architect: Henry L. Norton
- MPS: Outdoor Sculpture of Rhode Island MPS
- NRHP reference No.: 01000465
- Added to NRHP: October 19, 2001

The Rhode Island Red Monument in the hamlet of Adamsville of Little Compton, Rhode Island, at the intersection of Main Street, Adamsville Road, and Old Harbor Road, commemorates the Rhode Island Red breed of chicken, Rhode Island's state bird. The sculpture was completed in 1925 by Henry L. Norton from Winthrop, Massachusetts.

The text of the monument reads:

To commemorate the birthplace of the / Rhode Island Red breed of fowl which / originated near this location / --red fowls bred extensively by / the farmers of this district and later / named "Rhode Island Reds" and brought into / national prominence by the poultry fanciers -- this tablet placed by the / Rhode Island Red Club of America / with contributions of Rhode Island Red / breeders throughout the world / on land donated by / Deborah Manchester / 1925

The monument was added to the National Register of Historic Places in 2001.

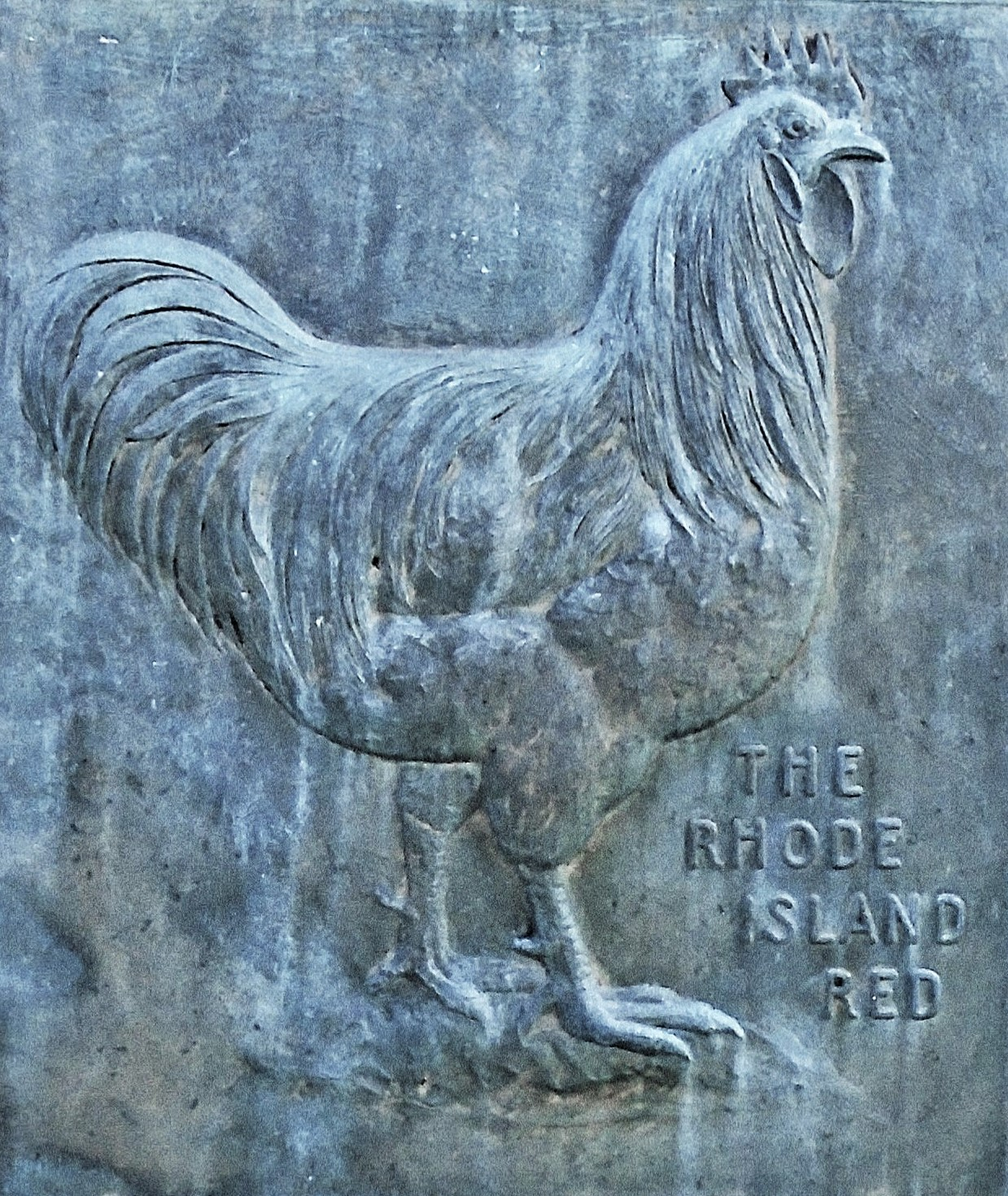
Henry L. Norton's relief sculpture of a Rhode Island Red rooster

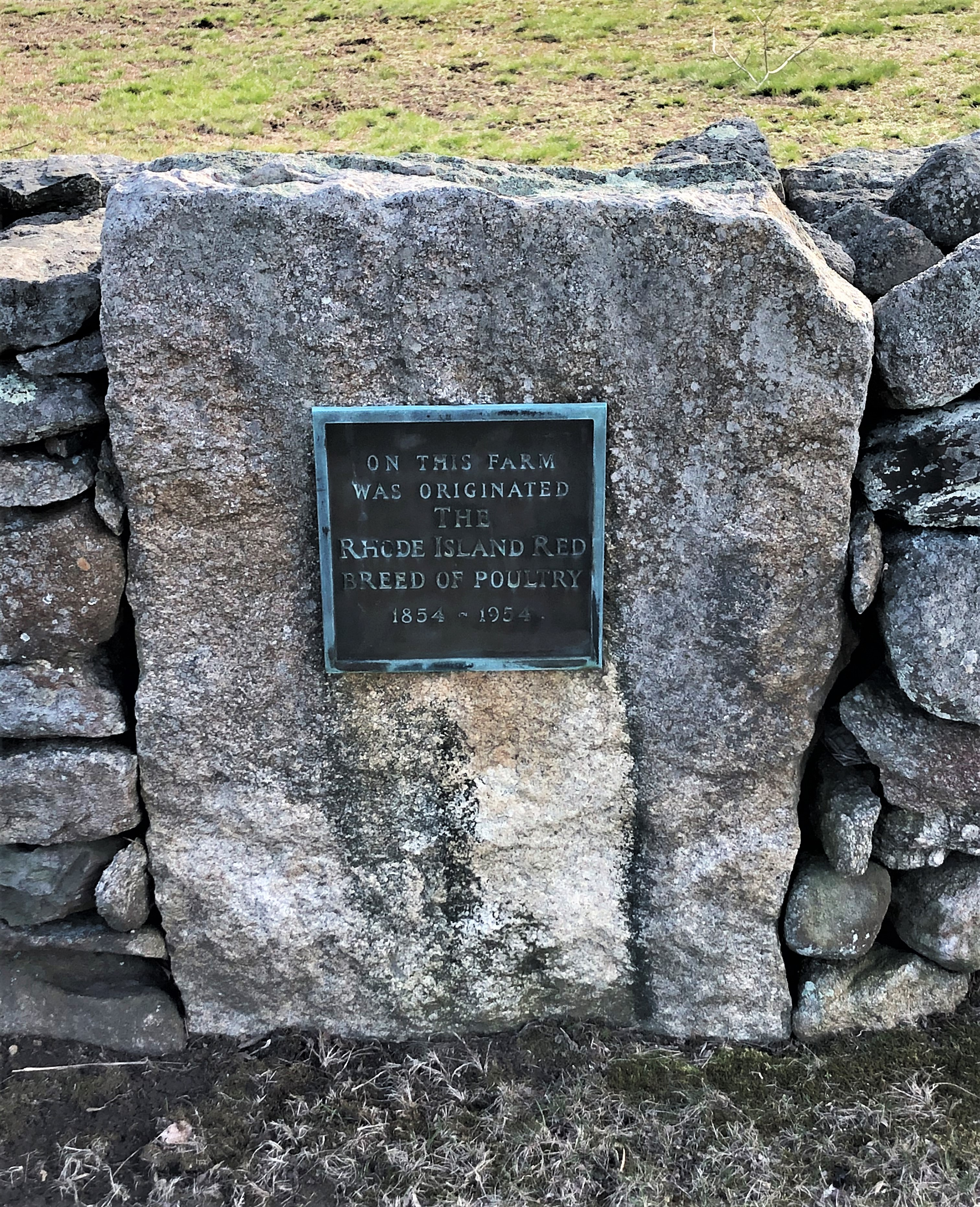
The centennial monument at Tripp's Farm

== History ==
By 1925, the Rhode Island Red was no longer a practical hen for farmers. New, better breeds, were established, and they were just called "Reds". Rhode Islanders, Little Compton boosters, and the many poultry fanciers who still raised them, wanted to call attention to the breed. They were inspired, in part, by the new memorial in Winterset Iowa for the delicious apple – if an apple could have a memorial, why not a hen?. The Rhode Island Red Club of America, a chicken-breeder organization founded in 1898, raised the funds for the monument.

There was significant debate about the proper location for the monument. While there was agreement that Little Compton was the right place for a monument as the Rhode Island Red had originated as a breed there in the 1850s, and became a key part of the local economy from about 1870 to 1910, there was disagreement about just where in town it should be built. Two sites were initially considered. The Rhode Island Red Club of America, which represented poultry fanciers wanted it in Adamsville, a more prominent spot for tourists. Some locals wanted it nearer to the Tripp farm, where the breed was created. The debate continued up to the unveiling of the memorial, and beyond: The Providence Journal devoted a page to the story with the headline "Adamsville give hen place in the sun." But many prominent Rhode Island Red enthusiasts were not there. Another headline: "Monument to Hen divides breeders."

The debate continued even after the unveiling of the monument. The following year, the town council gave approval for a second memorial, at the intersection on West Main Road and the road to the Commons. This was to be a hen, not a rooster. The Providence Journal covered the story with glee, writing "The Little Compton hen will go far toward assuaging the grievances which have divided the two villages into hostile camps, for Adamsville will have its rooster and Little Compton will have its hen, and peace will reign forever. Hallelujah!"

=== Centennial monument ===
Though the second monument was never built, another memorial was. In 1954, the 100th anniversary of the Rhode Island Red, the same year that the Rhode Island legislature voted the Rhode Island Red the state bird, the Rhode Island Red Club and local residents installed a plaque at the location where William Tripp raised his famous chickens, at the intersection of William Sisson Road and Long Highway.

The text of the plaque on the centennial monument reads:

On this farm / was originated / the / Rhode Island Red / breed of poultry / 1854 - 1954

== See also ==
- National Register of Historic Places listings in Newport County, Rhode Island
