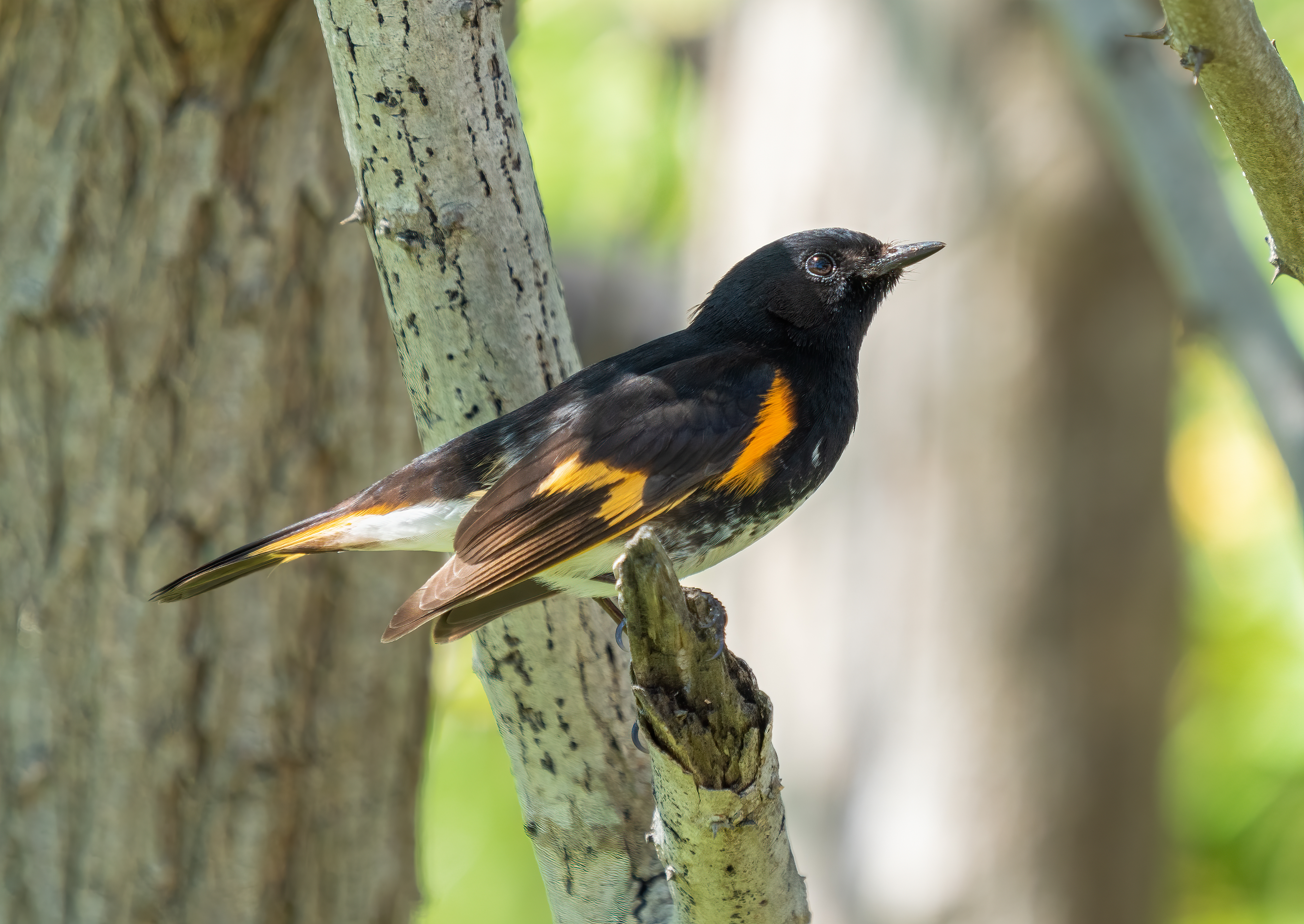
- Male in Jamaica Bay Wildlife Refuge
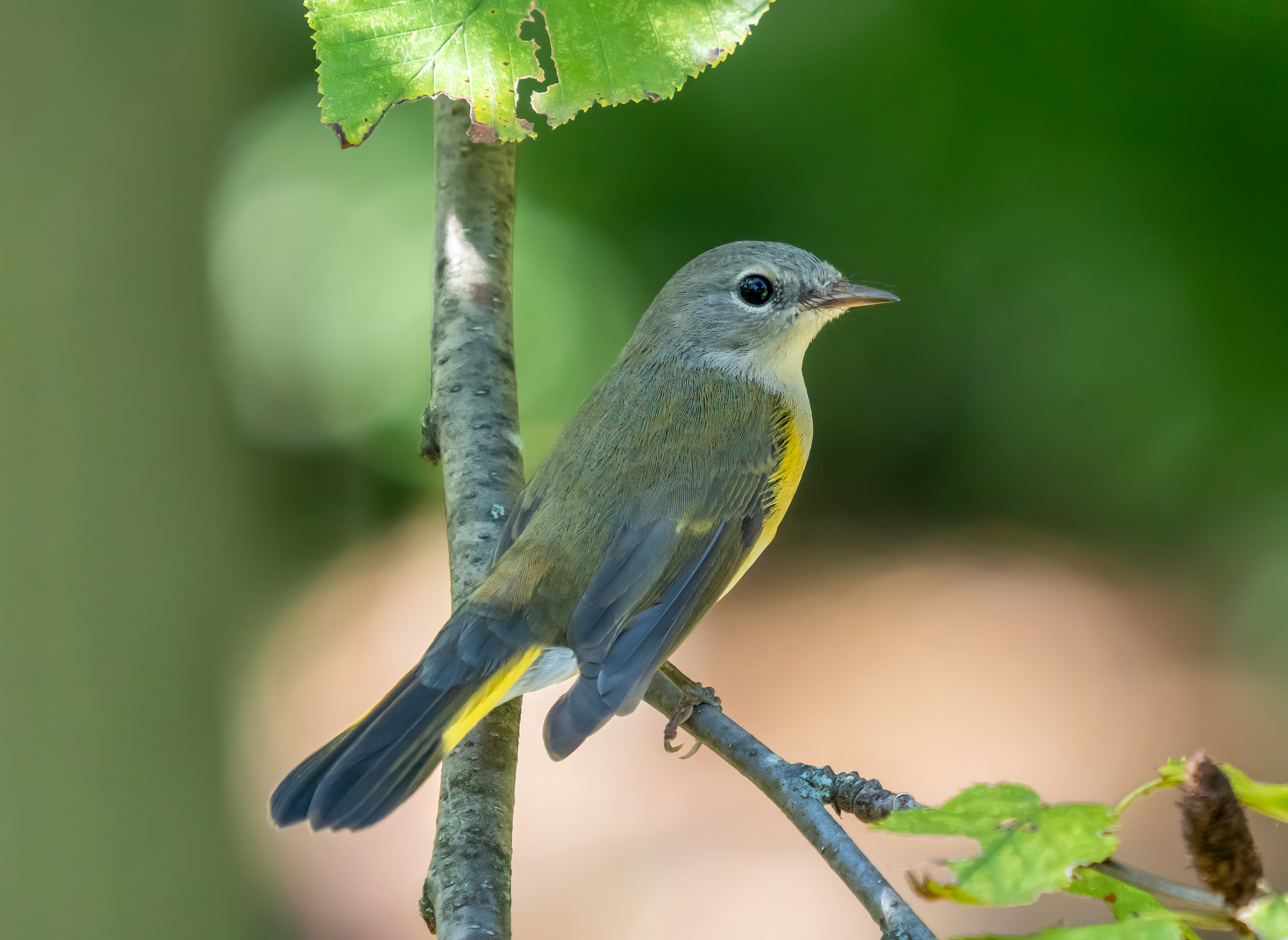
- Female

Conservation status
- Least Concern (IUCN 3.1)

Scientific classification
- Kingdom: Animalia
- Phylum: Chordata
- Class: Aves
- Order: Passeriformes
- Family: Parulidae
- Genus: Setophaga
- Species: S. ruticilla

Binomial name
- Setophaga ruticilla (Linnaeus, 1758)
- S. ruticilla range Breeding range Wintering range

Synonyms
- Motacilla ruticilla Linnaeus, 1758; Muscicapa ruticilla Linnaeus, 1766

= American redstart =

Species of bird

The American redstart (Setophaga ruticilla) is a New World warbler. It is only distantly related to the Old World (common) redstart, with both belonging to the order Passeriformes.

== Taxonomy ==
The American redstart was described by Carl Linnaeus in 1758 in the 10th edition of his Systema Naturae under the binomial name Motacilla ruticilla.

The genus name Setophaga is from Ancient Greek σής : sēs (genitive σητός : sētós) "moth", and φάγος : phágos "eater".

The specific ruticilla is Neo-Latin for "redstart" from Latin rutilus, "red", and the diminutive -cilla.

In Ancient Greek the name was φοινίκουρος : phoiníkouros (from φοῖνιξ : phoĩnix- "red" and οὐρά : ourá "tail") "Redstart" refers to the male's red tail, "start" being an old word for tail.

== Description ==
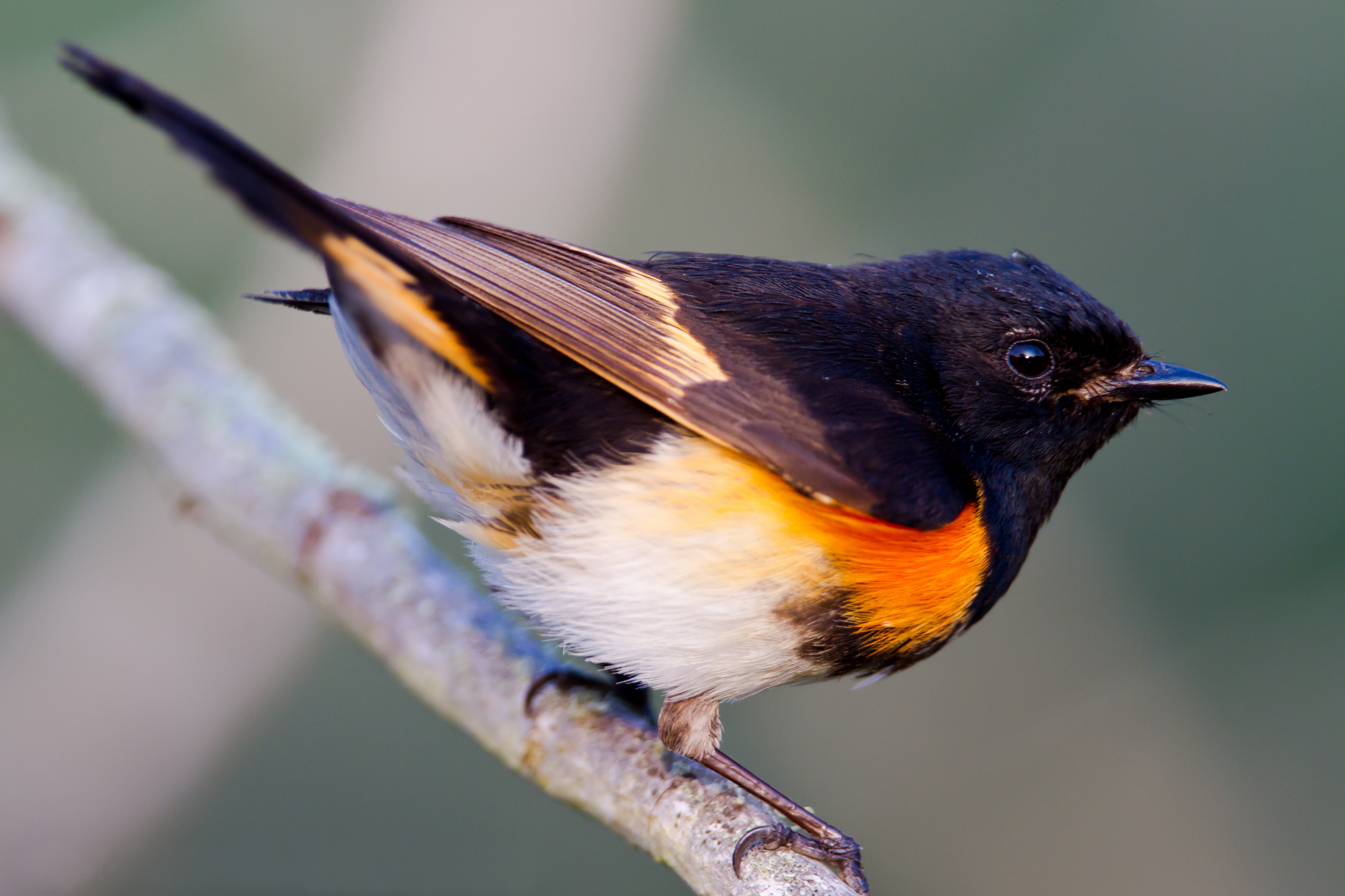
American redstart of Quintana, Texas

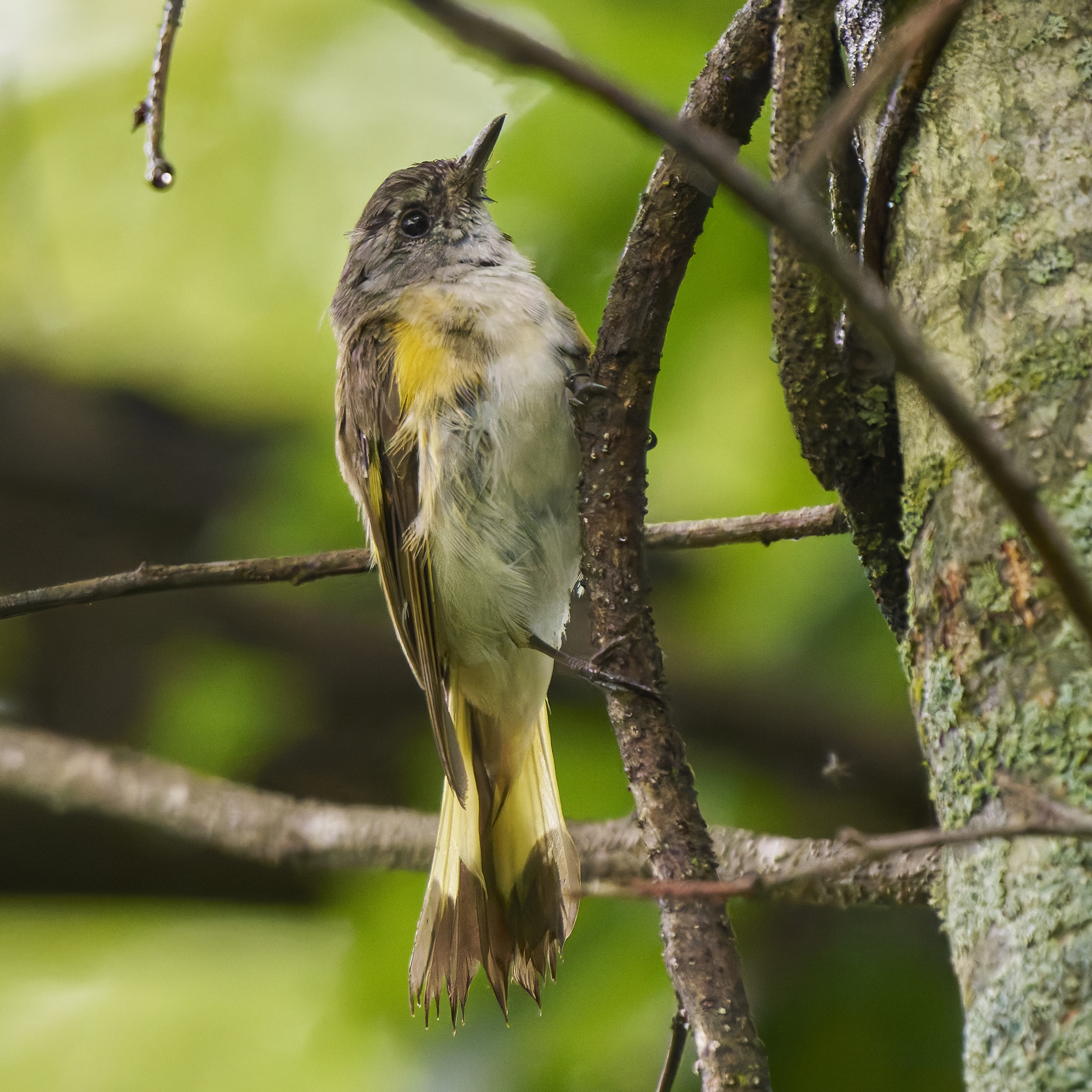
Juvenile or Female. Pleasant Valley Wildlife Sanctuary

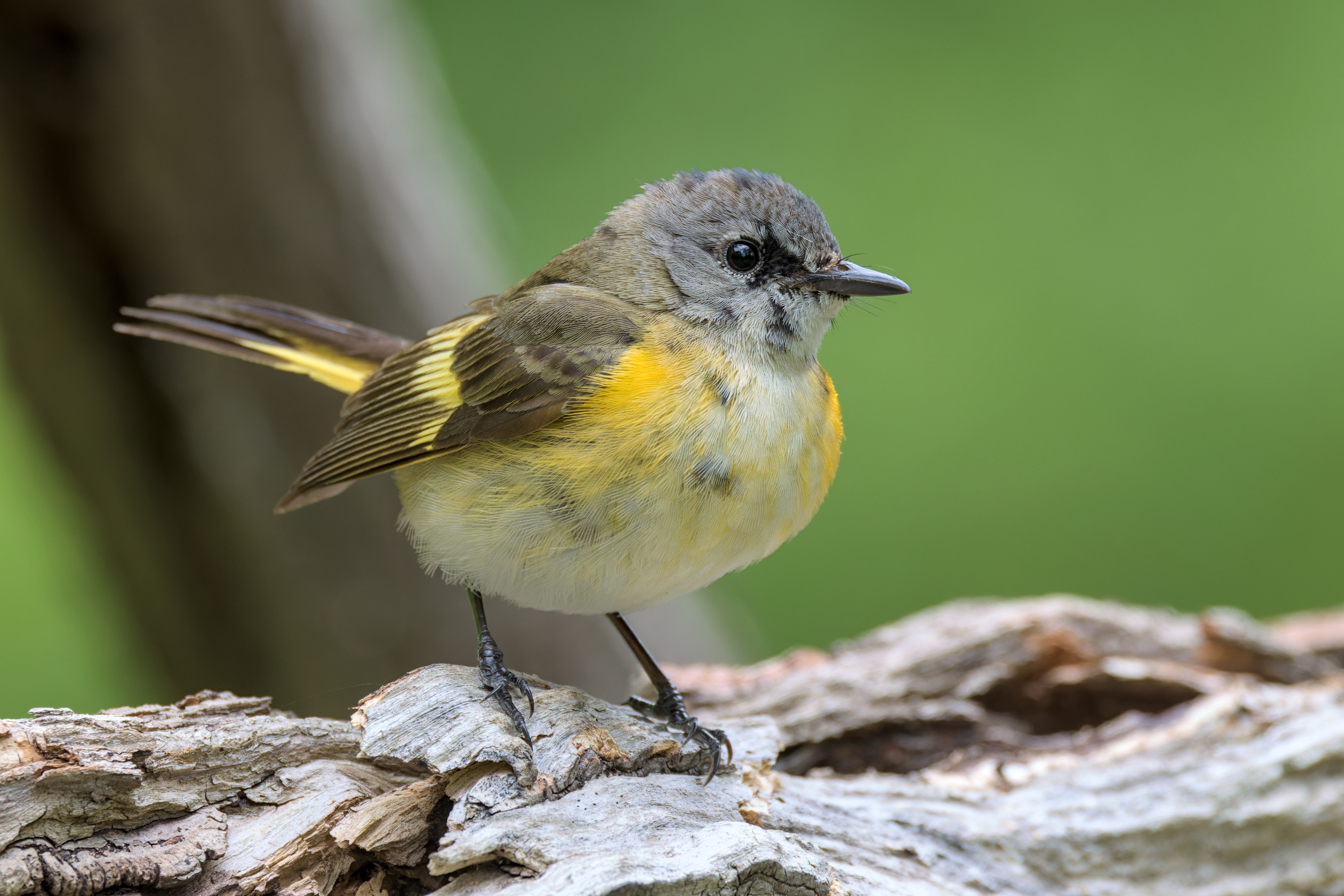
Immature American redstart from Chicago, Illinois

The American redstart is a smallish warbler. It measures 11 to 14 cm (4.3 to 5.5 in) in total length and has a wingspan of 16 to 23 cm (6.3 to 9.1 in). Its length is boosted by a relatively long tail and it is one of the lightest birds in its family. Weight is considerably less in winter than in summer. Males weigh an average of 8.6 g (0.30 oz) in summer but drop to 7.2 g (0.25 oz) in winter, while females drop even more from an average of 8.7 g (0.31 oz) to an average of 6.9 g (0.24 oz). Among standard measurements, the wing chord is 5.5 to 6.9 cm (2.2 to 2.7 in), the tail is 4.9 to 5.8 cm (1.9 to 2.3 in), the bill is 0.7 to 0.9 cm (0.28 to 0.35 in) and the tarsus is 1.5 to 1.9 cm (0.59 to 0.75 in). The breeding males are unmistakable, jet black above apart from large orange-red patches on their wings and tails. Their breast sides are also orange, with the rest of their underparts white. In their other plumages, American redstarts display green in their upperparts, along with black central tails and grey heads. The orange patches of the breeding males are replaced by yellow in the plumages of the females and young birds. Orange and yellow coloration is due to the presence of carotenoids; males possess the red carotenoid canthaxanthin and the yellow carotenoids canary xanthophyll A and B, all of which mix together to produce an orange color, while the females possess only the yellow carotenoids. Recent research indicates that an age and sex effect on observed color attributes of hue, brightness, and saturation exists in American redstarts, with the exception for saturation, which only showed an age effect. Their song is a series of musical see notes. Their call is a soft chip.

== Hybridization ==
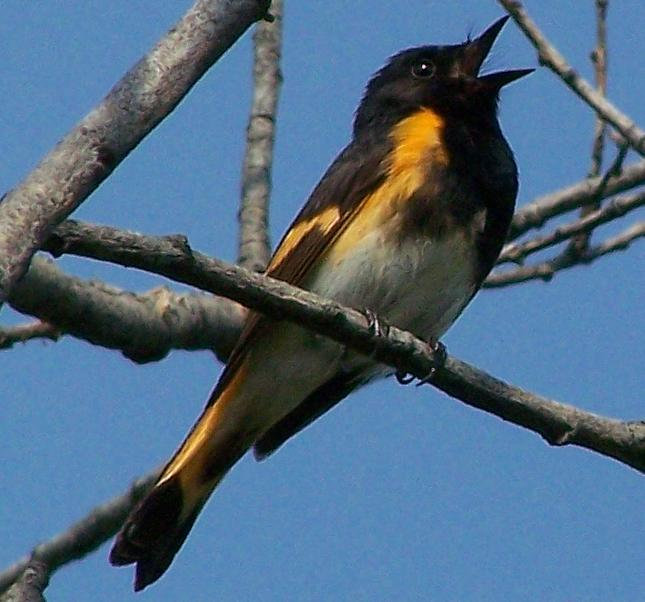
Male American redstart

Rare hybrids between the American redstart and the congeneric magnolia warbler (Setophaga magnolia) have been documented on two occasions, in Ohio, USA, and Quebec, Canada. In both cases, the hybrid's mother was a magnolia warbler and the father was a redstart.

== Distribution and habitat ==
American redstart

Although perhaps not as common as in the past, the redstart appears to be one of the most stable and abundant species of New World warbler; its numbers exceeded in total by the common yellowthroat, yellow warbler and yellow-rumped warbler, because of much wider natural breeding ranges in those species and perhaps exceeding those in sheer density within appropriate range. Their breeding is in North America, spanning southern Canada and the eastern United States. They are migratory, wintering in Central America, the West Indies, and northern South America, and are very rare vagrants to western Europe. During the breeding season, the redstart inhabits open-canopy, mostly deciduous forests, second growth, and forest edges. It is insectivorous, often sharing its foraging habitats with other warblers, and is found feeding in the mid to lower regions of a tree or shrub. A wide range of habitats are occupied during migration, including many shrubby areas. On its wintering grounds in Central and South America, the redstart may be found in nearly all woody habitats but tends to avoid non-forested agricultural areas. It is often found in shade-grown coffee plantations, which provide native trees and shrubs, as well as coffee trees. Elevations occupied vary by location, with redstarts found at elevations up to 3,000 m (9,800 ft) in South America, but only 1,500 m (4,900 ft) in Jamaica.

== Behavior ==
=== Breeding ===
The breeding habitats of the redstarts are open woodlands or scrub, often located near water. They nest in the lower part of a bush, laying 2–5 eggs in a neat cup-shaped nest. The clutch is incubated by the female for 10 to 13 days. The young fledge after 9 days in the nest, and may remain with one parent for up to 3 weeks afterwards. First-year males are able to reproduce during their first breeding season, but they retain the female-like plumage which may contribute to low reproductive success (less than 50% of first-year males) until year 2. In contrast, most first-year females successfully reproduce during their first breeding season. There is evidence for a skewed sex ratio that results in a surplus of unmated males.

American redstarts display a mixed mating strategy; they are predominantly monogamous but around 25% of males maintain multiple territories and are polygynous. Even within monogamous pairs, a high proportion of offspring—as many as 40%—are not fathered by the male of the pair. The intensity of the male's coloration (which is due to carotenoid pigments) predicts their success at holding territory in their non-breeding, winter locations in the Caribbean, the probability that they will be polygynous, and the proportion of offspring in their nests that they will themselves father. Males are invariably very territorial and the superior males occupy the best habitats, such as moist mangroves, while inferior males occupy secondary habitats such as dry scrub forests.

=== Feeding ===
The redstarts feed almost exclusively on insects which are usually caught by flycatching. American redstarts also have been known to catch their insect prey by gleaning it from leaves. This is a very active species. The tail is often held partly fanned out. These birds have been observed flashing the orange and yellow of their tails on and off to startle and chase insects from the underbrush. Overall, this species is a very flexible, opportunistic feeder that can easily adapt to varying habitat, season, insect community, vegetation structure, and time of day. The diet consists largely of caterpillars, moths, flies, leafhoppers and planthoppers, small wasps, beetles, aphids, stoneflies and spiders. Few berries and seeds are consumed, but are most often from barberry, serviceberry, and magnolia.

== Mortality ==
The oldest known banded redstart lived to over 10 years of age. Other adults have been known to reach around 5 years. However, few survive past the first stages of life, as the bird is vulnerable to both terrestrial and aerial predators. Highest rates of predation occur during the breeding season when eggs and helpless nestlings are abundant and easy prey for varied predators. Females mostly brood during this period and thus often fall prey to nest predators. Common terrestrial predators include red squirrels, fishers, eastern chipmunks, American black bears, flying squirrels, fox snakes, and domestic cats. Aerial predators take nestlings, eggs, or even adults in flight. Aerial predators include jaegers, blue jays, common ravens, northern saw-whet owls, common grackles, northern goshawks, sharp-shinned hawks, and Cooper's hawks.

== Conservation ==
Successful conservation efforts of the redstart, as for any other migrating bird, include protecting and providing habitat throughout its entire range. The benefits to coffee farms that redstarts and other "coffee birds" provide have encouraged coffee farmers to adapt shade trees and adjacent forest patches in their farming practices as additional habitat for the birds. While shade tree coffee farms offer a somewhat practical compromise between habitat preservation and agriculture, there is still not enough data to back the proposition that practices like shade tree coffee farms can replace the natural habitat that was once there. Still, the most effective method for American redstart conservation would be natural habitat preservation at wintering and breeding grounds.
