= Bousquet Mountain =

Ski area in Pittsfield, Massachusetts

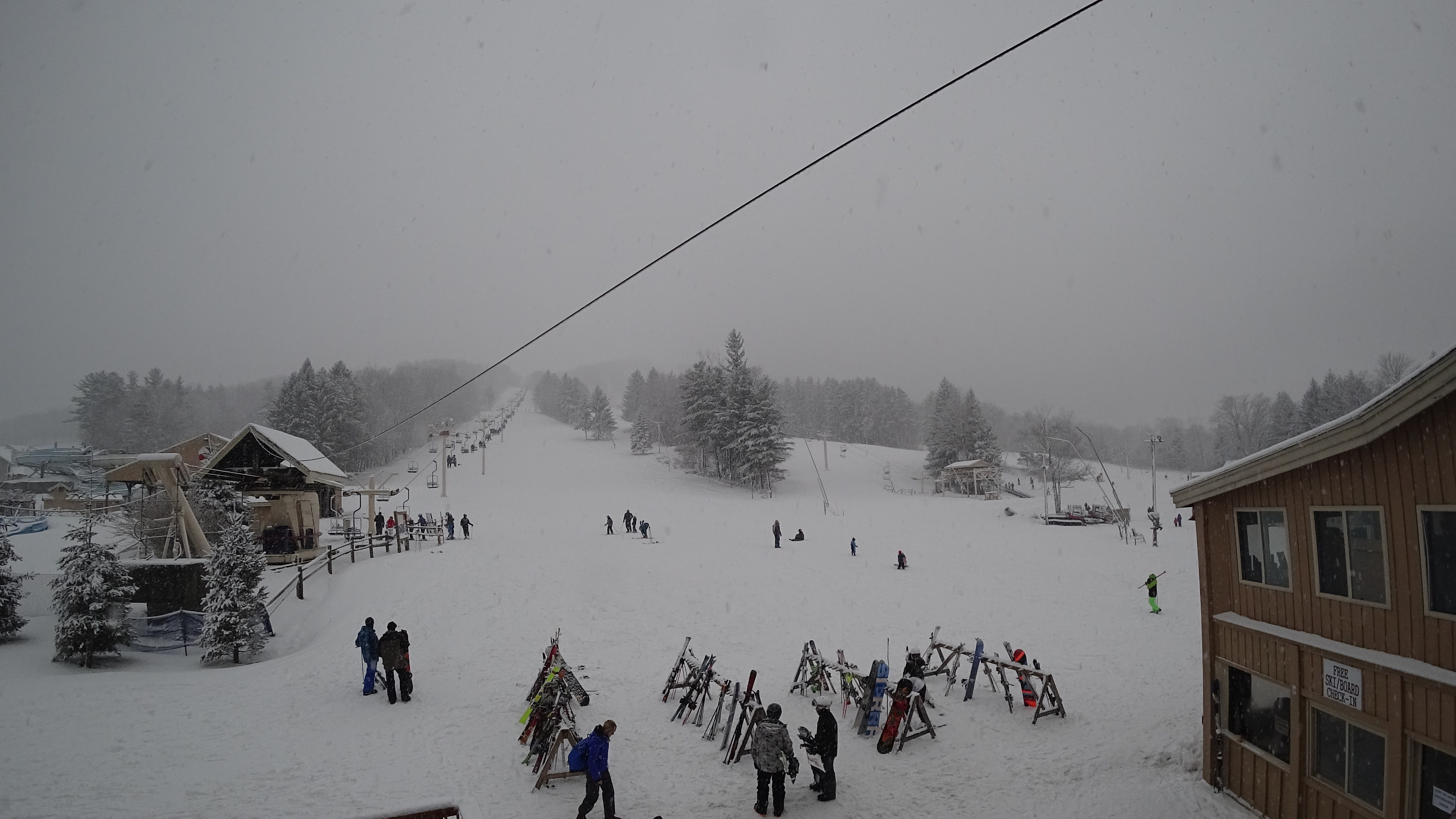
- Bousquet Ski Area in 2017.
- Interactive map of Bousquet Mountain
- Location: 101 Dan Fox Dr Pittsfield, Massachusetts, 01201
- Coordinates: 42.4171°N 73.2788°W
- Status: Operating
- Owner: Mill Town Capital
- Vertical: 750 ft (230 m)
- Top elevation: 1,818 ft (554 m)
- Base elevation: 1,068 ft (326 m)
- Skiable area: 200 acres (81 ha)
- Trails: 24
- Lift system: 2 chairlifts (1 double,1 triple), 2 surface lifts.
- Terrain parks: Yes, 1
- Snowmaking: Yes, 85%
- Night skiing: Yes
- Website: bousquetmountain.com

Bousquet Mountain is a local ski area serving skiing and snowboarding located on a northern summit of Yokun Ridge in Pittsfield, Massachusetts within the Taconic Mountain Range. It is now owned by Mill Town Capital and shares a Summit pass with Berkshire East and Catamount Ski Area.

Snowtubing is also offered with 10 lanes, 100 tubes, a magic carpet, and snowmaking on the tubing hill.

== History ==
Opened in 1932, the resort is the oldest existing ski area in The Berkshires. Prior to its use as a ski area, the property was a mink farm belonging to Clarence J. "Clare" Bousquet. After his mink farming operation failed during the Great Depression, Bousquet responded to the interest of the Mount Greylock Ski Club, which had been using a steep pasture on his property as a practice run. He allowed the club to cut a 750-foot (230 m) ski slope to the northern summit of Mahanna Cobble (part of Yokun Ridge) in 1933.

=== Summary of developments ===
- In the 1935–36 season, the first rope tow was installed on the lower mountain.
- In the 1936–37 season, an upper mountain rope tow was constructed. Bousquet installed night skiing, with mercury vapor floodlights installed on poles in 1936 as part of a local partnership with General Electric.
- A third rope tow, which opened in 1937–38, relieved the expanding crowds.
- When another rope tow — the longest rope tow in the world at the time — was added in 1938-39, Bousquet was nicknamed one of America’s finest ski developments. It was also described as the "most mechanized ski center in the East" because of its four rope tows. The rope tow gripper was invented by Bousquet and he filed for a patent. Bousquet marketed and subsequently sold 500,000 of his grippers.
- The 1940–41 season gave the mountain a fifth rope tow for night skiing.
- A new base lodge opened in 1941, with a fireplace from the old farm.
- The mountain was sold to Don Soviero in 1956 and installed a T-Bar.
- In the 1957–58 season, Bousquet installed two Poma lifts and expanded into the snowmaking world.
- in 1960 Bosquet was open daily as well as Wednesday through Saturday nights with lift fees costing US$4 for day passes and $1.50 for nights. The ski season was from approximately November through April.
- They installed a Carlevaro & Savio double lift in the 1962–63 season entering the chairlift world.
- Don Soviero sold the mountain in 1967. Paul Bousquet was able to buy it back the following year.
- A second double chair serving the lower half of the mountain opened in the 1960–81 season. It was manufactured by Hall.
- In 1981, Four Skiers Enterprises bought Bousquet and started summer operations.
- The 2004–5 season came with a Hall double chair from Eastover, Massachusetts.
- In 2012, ownership of the mountain was transferred to Sherry Roberts. She continued to operate it but sought a buyer. In May 2020, the ski area is sold to Mill Town Capital< which began updating and improving the facilities.
- Bousquet currently operates 2 chairlifts, and 2 surface lifts.

Name	Type	Manufacturer	Built	Length (feet)	Notes
Yellow	Triple	Poma	2020	-	Main lift to the summit of Bousquet. Relocated from the Hermitage Club VT.
Blue	Double	Hall	1980	1971	One of the original chairs installed at the mountain.

== Other Businesses ==
Mill Town Capital also purchased two other businesses in 2020 to operate under the Bousquet brand.

- The Camp is a 130-acre campground overlooking Richmond Pond with many lodging options.
- Bousquet Sport is an athletic club that was originally the Berkshire West Athletic Club and currently offers Tennis, Pickleball, and Fitness options.
