= Yokun Ridge =

Ridge in Massachusetts, United States of America

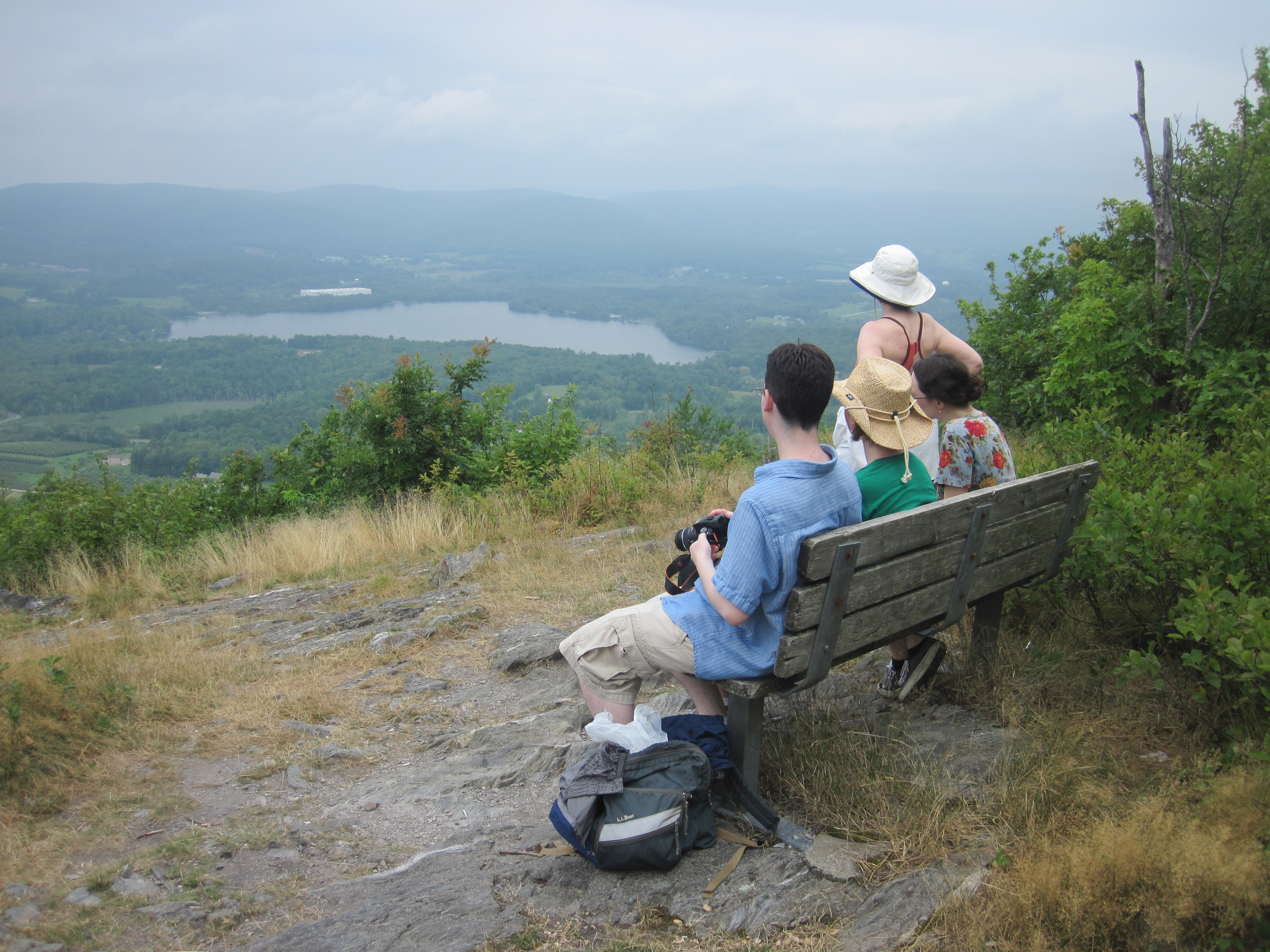
- View from Lenox Mountain

Highest point
- Elevation: 2,139 ft (652 m)

Dimensions
- Length: 9 mi (14 km) north-south

Geography
- Location within Massachusetts
- Country: United States
- State: Massachusetts
- Region: Berkshire County
- Range coordinates: 42°21′5″N 73°20′16″W
- Parent range: Taconic Mountains
- Biome: northern hardwood forest

Geology
- Orogeny: Taconic orogeny
- Rock age: 440 million years
- Rock type: thrust fault

Yokun Ridge consisting mainly of West Stockbridge Mountain and the Lenox Mountain massif, is a ten-mile stretch of the Taconic Mountains south of Pittfield, Mass. The term was invented in 1971 by a conservation group and was accepted in 2009 by the United States Board on Geographic Names. But the term doesn't appear on standard, US Geological Survey maps.

Both Lenox Mountain and West Stockbridge Mountain are known for recreational and scenic value, as well as conserved land and proximity to the tourist attractions of Lenox and Stockbridge. Yokun Ridge is in West Stockbridge, Stockbridge, Lenox, Richmond, and Pittsfield, Massachusetts. Approximately one-third of the zone is protected as open space reserve, municipal watershed, and wildlife sanctuary.

== Geography ==
Yokun Ridge is an actual "ridge" at West Stockbridge Mountain, yet most of the Lenox Mountain massif is a more amorphous upland, hosting a couple of small municipal reservoirs (at an elevation of about 1,400 feet) for nearby Lenox. It includes from south to north, West Stockbridge Mountain 1,831 feet (558 m) and the various summits of Lenox Mountain 2,139 feet (652 m), Yokun Seat 2,133 feet (650 m), The Damp 1,814 feet (553 m), and Mahanna Cobble 1,903 feet (580 m). Subordinate peaks include Baldhead 1,677 feet (511 m) (now wooded at its summit), Osceola Mountain 1,548 feet (472 m), and The Cobble 1,558 feet (475 m). (Surrounding lowlands average around 800–900 feet)

Water bodies on Yokun Ridge include Lake Averic, Fairfield Pond, the two Lenox Reservoirs, also the very small Shadowbrook Reservoir (sometimes called Monks Pond locally), and Darey Pond, plus various small brooks, ponds, and wetlands. A waterfall on the west side of Lenox Mountain in Stevens Glen. The southwest side of the ridge drains into Cone Brook, thence into the Williams River, the Housatonic River, and Long Island Sound; the southeast side drains into Marsh Brook, Stockbridge Bowl, and Larrywaug Brook, thence into the Housatonic River; the northwest side drains into Richmond Pond and Southwest Branch Brook, thence the Housatonic River; and the northeast side drains into Yokun Brook, thence into the Housatonic River.

The Massachusetts Turnpike passes the south end of West Stockbridge Mountain, while at the opposite, northern end of Yokun Ridge is Bousquet Ski Area in Pittsfield.

== Geology ==
West Stockbridge Mountain and the several Lenox Mountain summits are mostly part of the allochthonous Everett Formation, described as "largely greenish-gray, or dark-grey quartzose schist." Fine-grained mica in the matrix gives the rock a "phyllitic sheen." The formation may have been originally deposited to the east and then thrust into its present position, riding over the separate Stockbridge and Wallomsac formations.

== Nomenclature ==
The name Yokun derives from Jehoiakim Yokun, a mid-18th century Native American of the Mahican tribe. As early as the 19th century, Yokun's name was applied to "Yokun Seat," a summit of Lenox Mountain and accepted by the U.S. Board of Geographic Names in 1894.

George Wislocki, first director of the Berkshire Natural Resources Council, invented the name "Yokun Ridge" 1971. In coining his new term, Wislocki hoped to draw attention to perceived continuity of highlands to the west of Lenox and north-western Stockbridge.

"Yokun Ridge" was accepted by the Board on Geographic Names in 2009. Apparently in error, the board cited as a first reference for this term a 1939 WPA regional guidebook titled "The Berkshire Hills." However, the term "Yokun Ridge" doesn't appear in the WPA work, which cites instead the historical figure Yokun in several contexts including as a source for the name of Lenox Mountain's "Yokun Seat" summit as well as for the obsolete appellation "Yokuntown" for the town of Lenox.

The Appalachian Mountain Club employs "Yokun Ridge" in the 2004 and 2009 edition of its Massachusetts Trail Guide. The Massachusetts Audubon Society, the Town of Lenox, and the Bousquet Ski Area have also used the term.

== History ==
Although Yokun Ridge only emerged as a geographical concept in 1971, in the 1740s, Jehoiakim Yokun and another Native American of the Mahican Tribe bought all the unsold land between Stockbridge and Pittsfield for 12 English pounds from two fellow tribesmen. The land was subsequently acquired by the English in the 1750s. The Dutch name "Jehoiakim" may indicate that Jehoiakim Yokun was baptized by the Dutch in the Hudson Valley, a region where most Mahicans resided at the time. Yokun subsequently was active in the French and Indian Wars while later his son, Timothy, participated in the American Revolution as a member of the Stockbridge Militia at the Siege of Boston and died in a battle in the vicinity of present-day Van Cortlandt Park in Bronx, N.Y. "Yokuntown" (a designation for the village of Lenox in the 18th century) was named after Yokun.

European settlers logged the area's forests for lumber and charcoal, the latter used as a source for nearby iron foundries, which helped supply ordnance in the American Civil War.

During the late 19th century's Gilded Age much of Yokun Ridge was held by a handful of large estates, including the Stokes property, whose 1894 "Shadowbrook Cottage" below Baldhead was at the time reputedly the largest residence in America. It later became the site of a Catholic seminary and was subsequently destroyed by fire. The seminary's replacement building is currently occupied by the health and yoga retreat Kripalu. A former Stokes outbuilding is part of the Shadow Brook Farm Historic District. The American author Nathaniel Hawthorne, who briefly lived near Yokun Ridge, describes a fictional walk to the top of Baldhead in his A Wonder-Book for Girls and Boys (1852). In the same work, Hawthorne describes Shadow Brook, the local name for a minor stream that flows in the ravine separating Baldhead from the southern reach of Lenox Mountain.

Tourism helped to boost interest in recreation and conservation in the area as early as 1929, when the Lenox Garden Club established the Pleasant Valley Wildlife Sanctuary on Lenox Mountain, now owned by the Massachusetts Audubon Society. The Bousquet Ski Area opened in 1932 on the north side of the ridge at Mahanna Cobble. The New York Philharmonic gave a series of summer concerts in 1934 at the Hanna Estate, located on the lower east side of West Stockbridge Mountain. Two years later, the Boston Symphony began its longstanding seasonal residency at nearby Tanglewood, the former Brooks Estate.

Beginning in the 1970s, the Berkshire Natural Resources Council and others helped to further highlight the area's recreational and scenic potential, in part by offering the invented name "Yokun Ridge" to emphasize its then relatively unrecognized continuity.

== Conservation ==
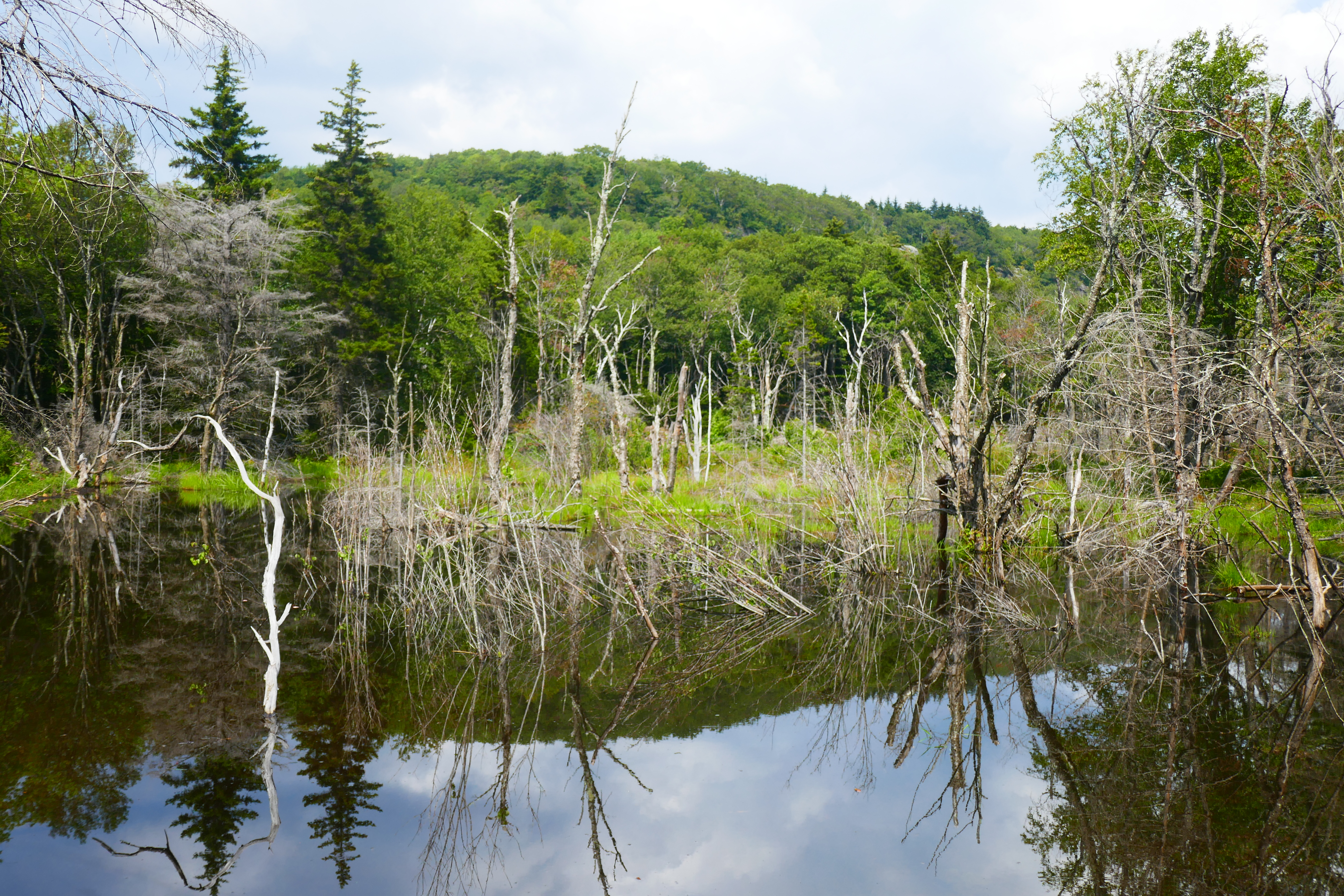
View of Lenox Mountain from Pleasant Valley Wildlife Sanctuary

Portions of Yokun Ridge are owned by the non-profit Berkshire Natural Resources Council (BNRC), the Massachusetts Audubon Society (MAS), and the towns of Lenox, Stockbridge, and West Stockbridge.

The ridge and certain outlying features were designated as part of a conservation planning area in 1993 by the U.S. Forest Service under its Forest Legacy Program. Called the "Stockbridge-Yokun Ridge Reserve," it consists of 6,300 acres and is among at least five in Massachusetts authorized in 1993 by the program, which enables federal purchases of conservation easements.

About 370 acres (1.5 km^{2}) in the Stockbridge-Yokun Ridge Reserve, or about 6 percent of the area, had been conserved using the Forest Legacy Program as of 2000. The northern boundary of the Stockbridge-Yokun Ridge Reserve conservation zone includes Mud Pond and its surrounding wetlands, and the outlying summit of South Mountain 1,388 feet (423 m). Both are located in Pittsfield.

In December 2010, the Berkshire Natural Resources Council closed on the purchase of 80 acres of land around Mahanna Cobble from the Bousquet Ski Area after two years of negotiation.

== Recreation ==
The BNRC maintains trails through its Olivia's Lookout property on West Stockbridge and Lenox Mountain; they also manage a roadside scenic vista along Lenox Road at the Stockbridge/ Lenox border, as well as Steven's Glen, a waterfall on Lenox Mountain Brook. The Massachusetts Audubon Society (MAS) maintains a network of hiking trails at their Pleasant Valley Wildlife Sanctuary in Lenox. Cooperative agreements with towns, private landholders, and MAS and BNRC have resulted in the marking of a ridgeline trail extending from the southern end of West Stockbridge Mountain to the Bousquet Ski Area. The trails are open to hiking, skiing, picnicking, and similar pursuits. Mountain biking is permitted in some areas.
