= Pleasant Valley Wildlife Sanctuary =

Wildlife sanctuary in Lenox, Massachusetts

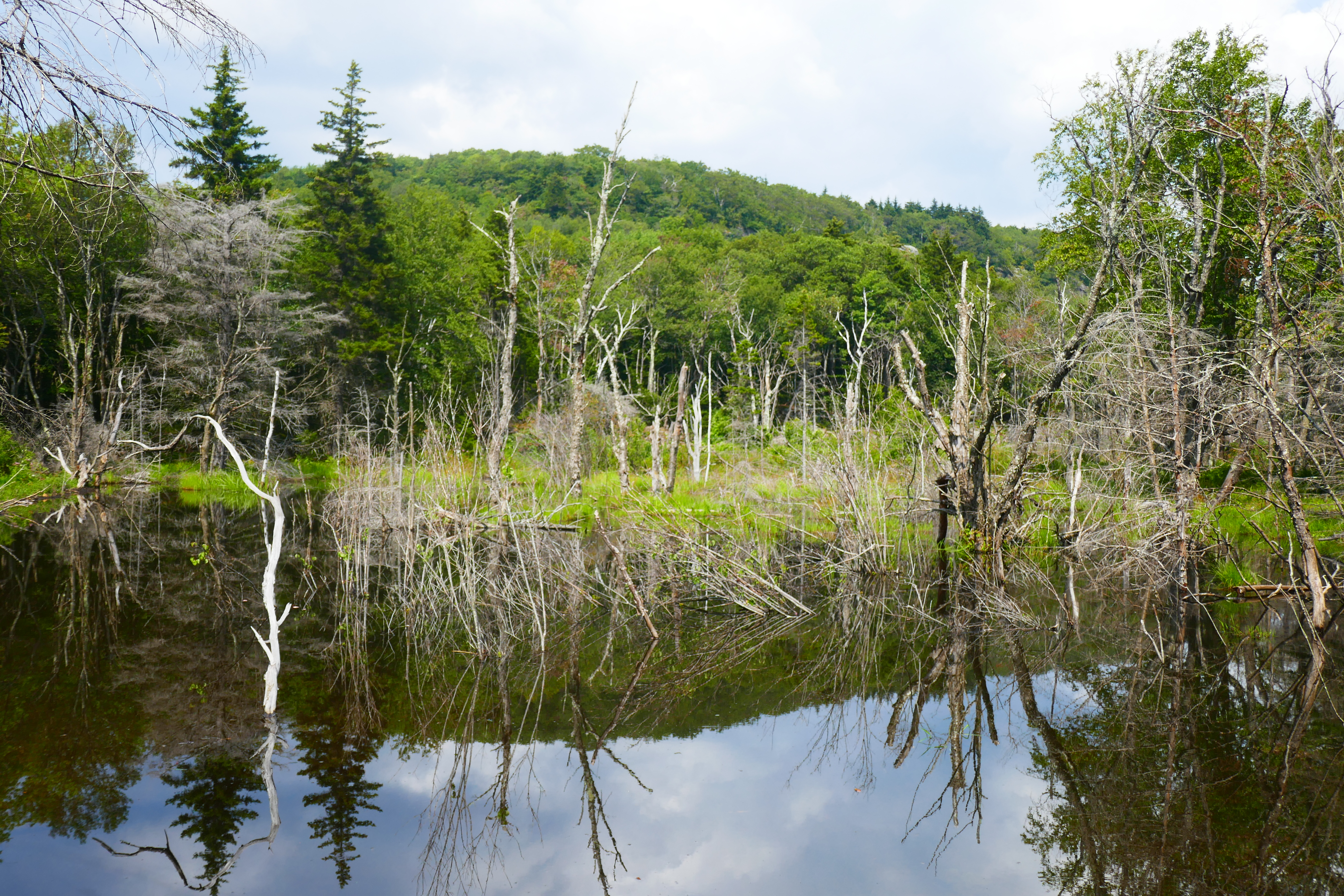
- Interactive map of Pleasant Valley Wildlife Sanctuary
- Type: Wildlife sanctuary
- Location: 472 West Mountain Road; Lenox, Massachusetts, USA
- Coordinates: 42°22′59″N 73°17′56″W
- Area: 1,405 acres (569 ha)
- Created: 1929
- Operator: Massachusetts Audubon Society
- Hiking trails: 7 miles
- Website: Pleasant Valley Wildlife Sanctuary

Pleasant Valley Wildlife Sanctuary is a 1,405 acres (569 ha) wildlife sanctuary located in Lenox, Massachusetts owned by the Massachusetts Audubon Society. There are 7 miles of trails and a large pond on Yokun Brook. The Overbrook Trail leads to the summit of Lenox Mountain (2126 feet).

Pleasant Valley has an outdoor summer day camp, seasonal special events, and year-round educational programs for everyone from preschoolers to adults.

== History ==
The sanctuary was founded in 1929, when members of the Lenox Garden Club established a new organization, the Pleasant Valley Bird and Wildflower Sanctuary. The first director was Maurice Broun. The sanctuary was acquired by Mass Audubon in 1950.

== Gallery ==
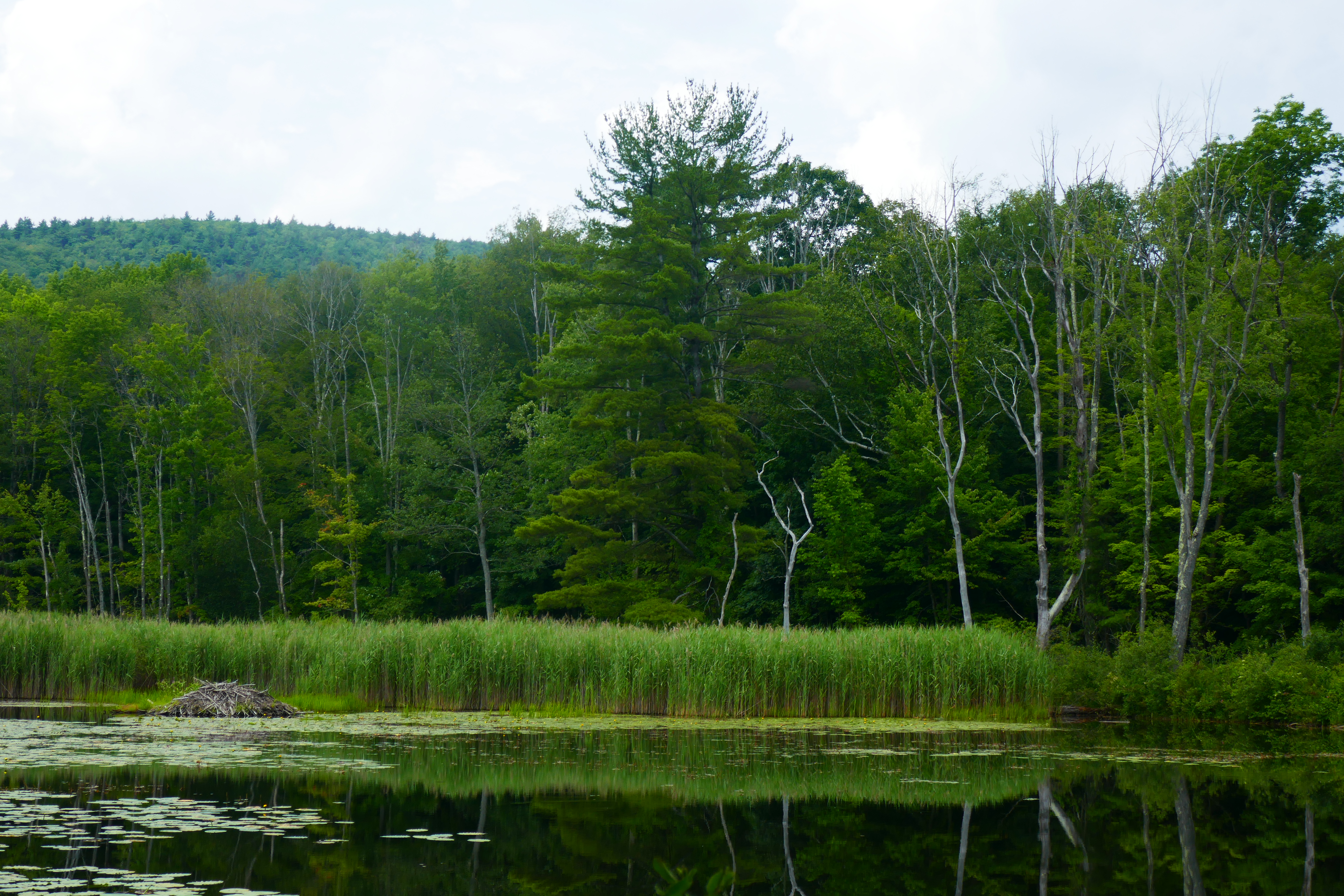
Beaver lodge in pond; Lenox Mountain is at rear

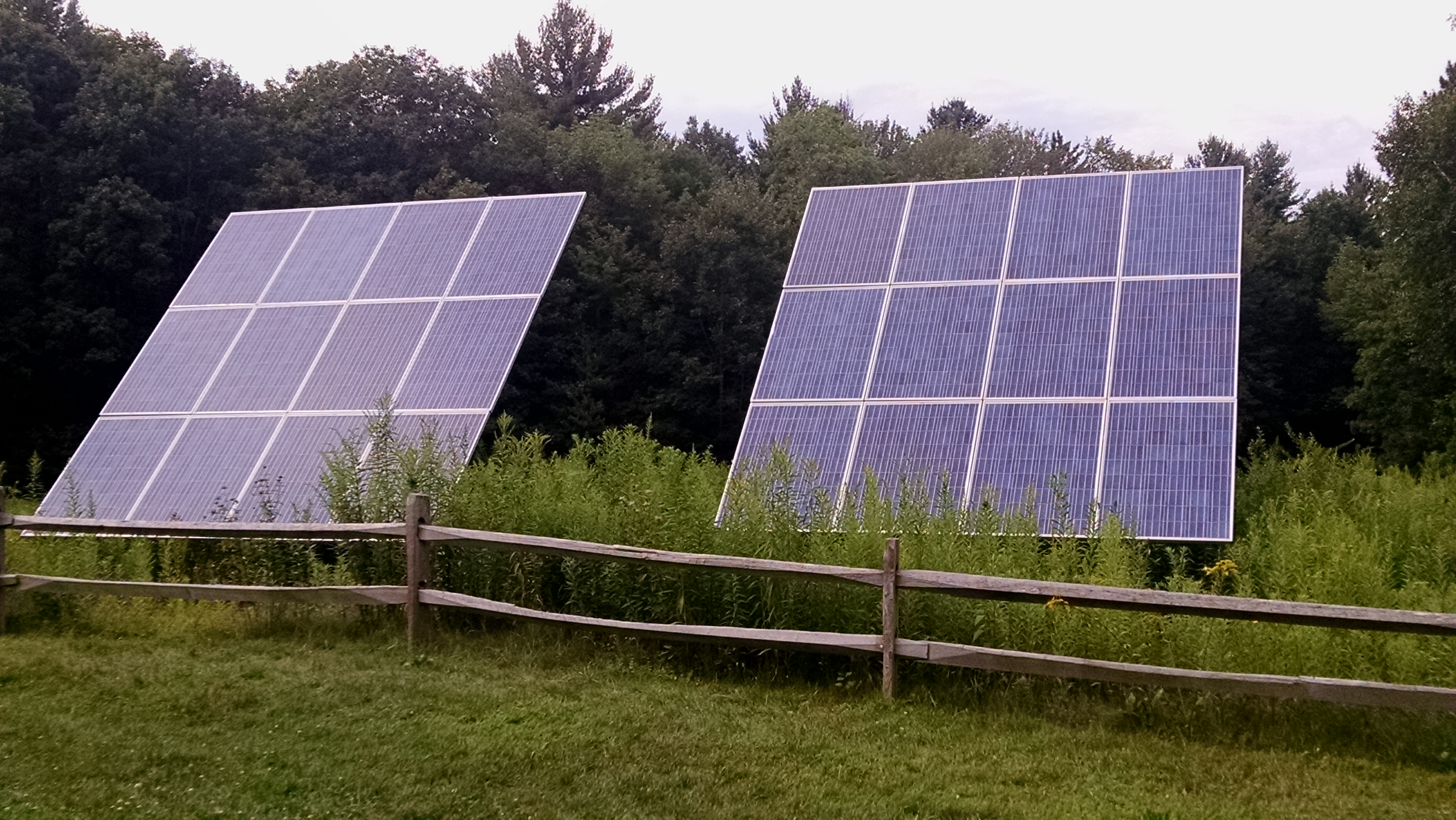
Solar Collectors

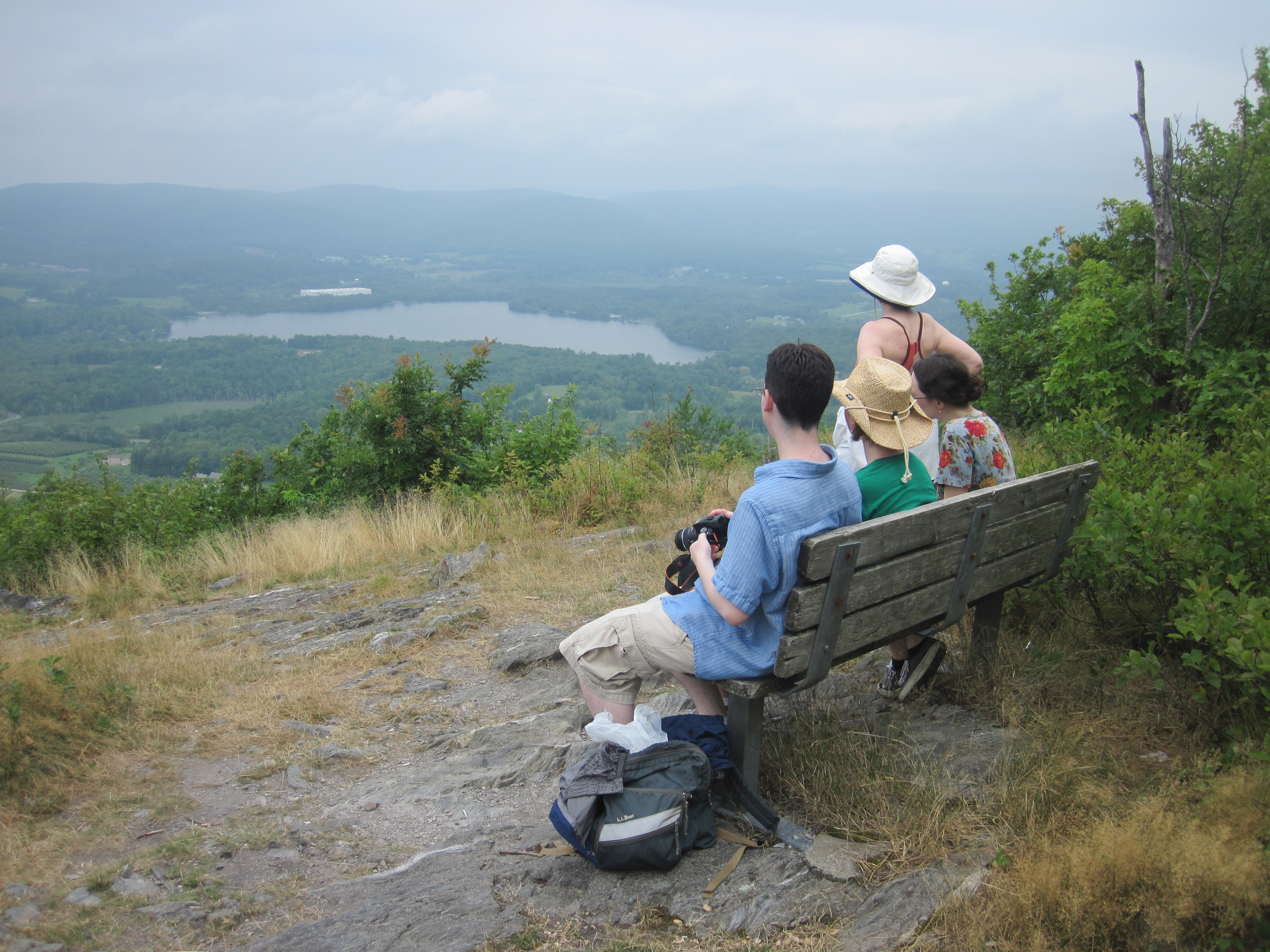
Summit of Lenox Mountain

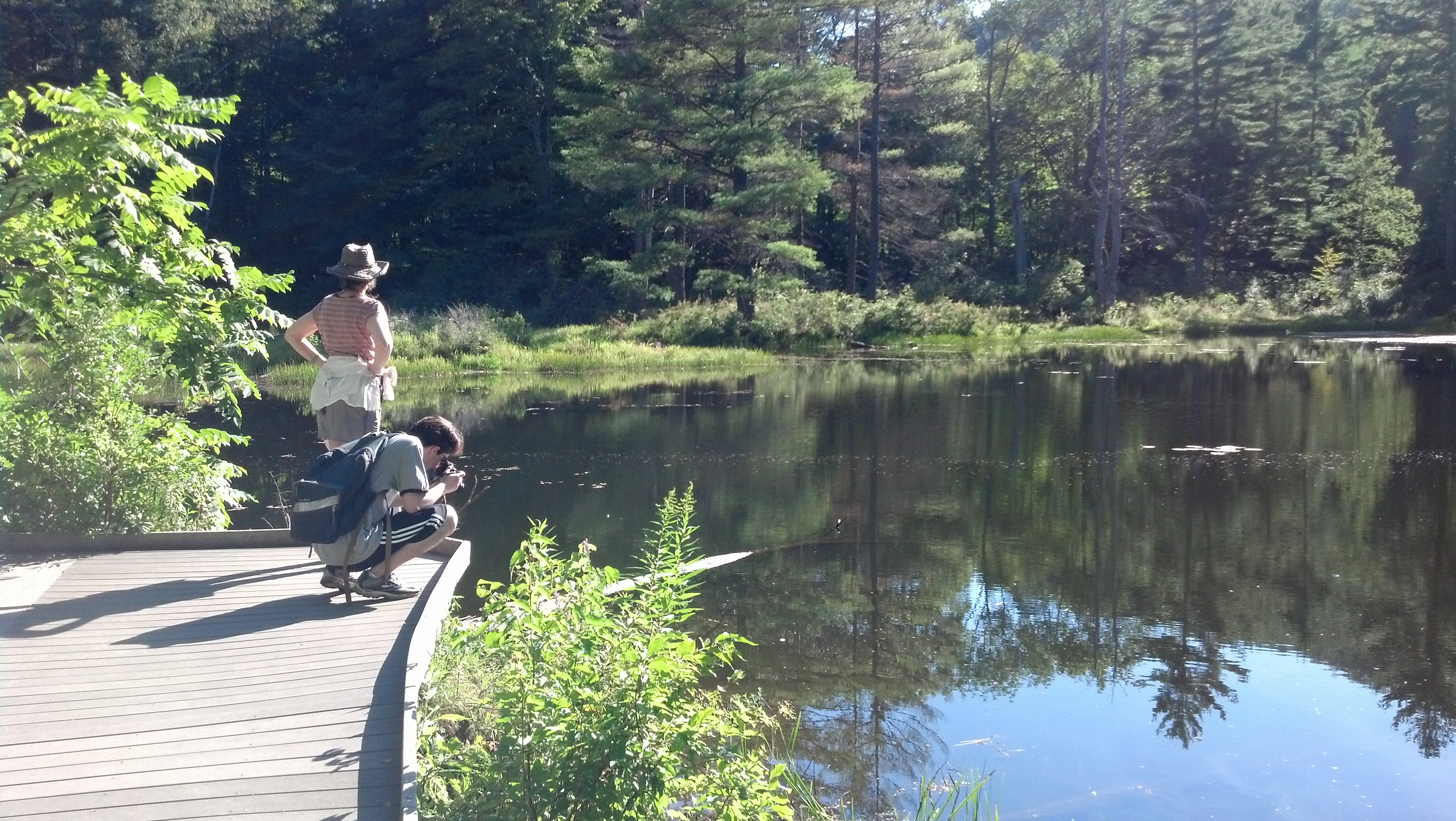
Accessible trail at Pike's Pond

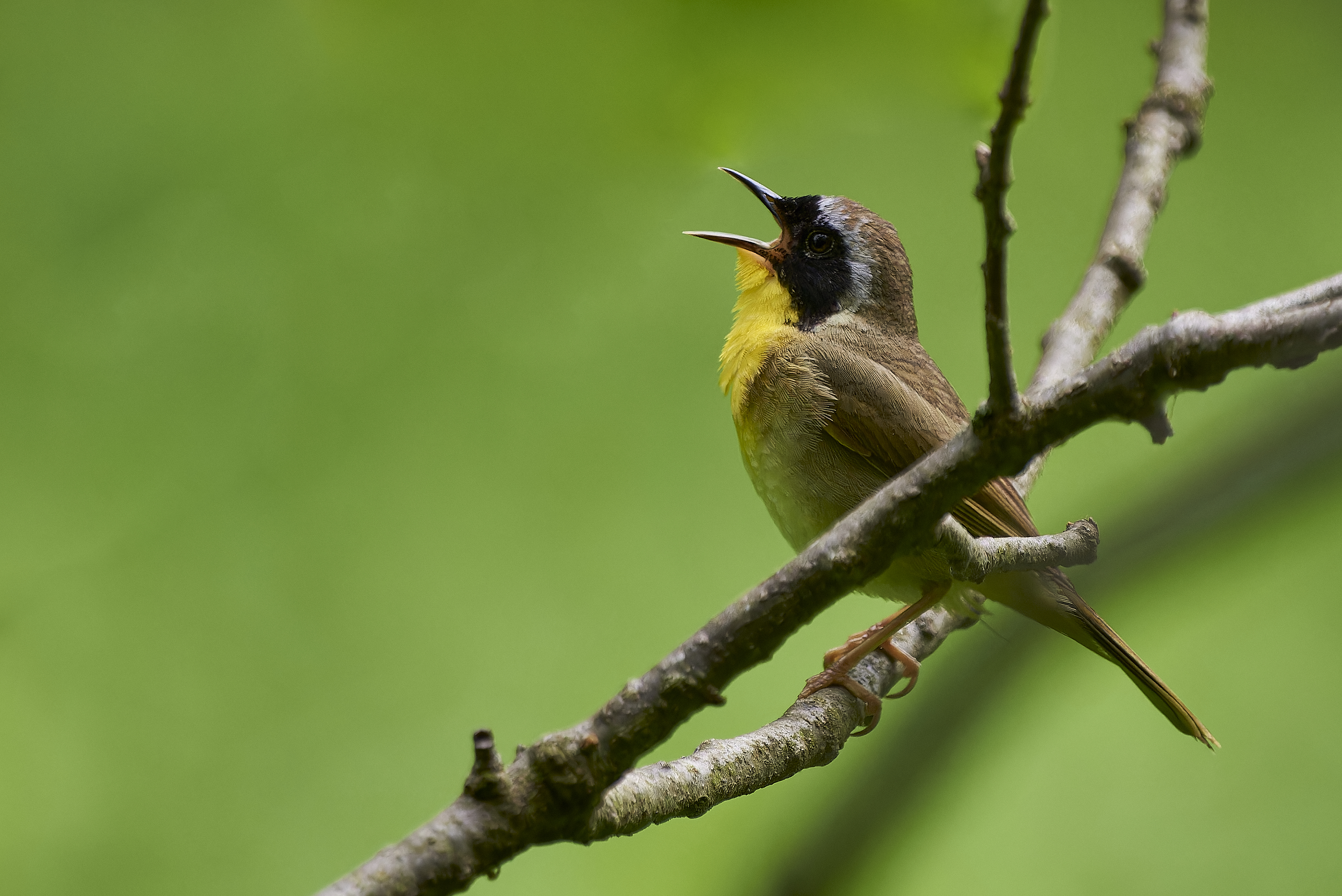
Common Yellowthroat near Bluebird Trail

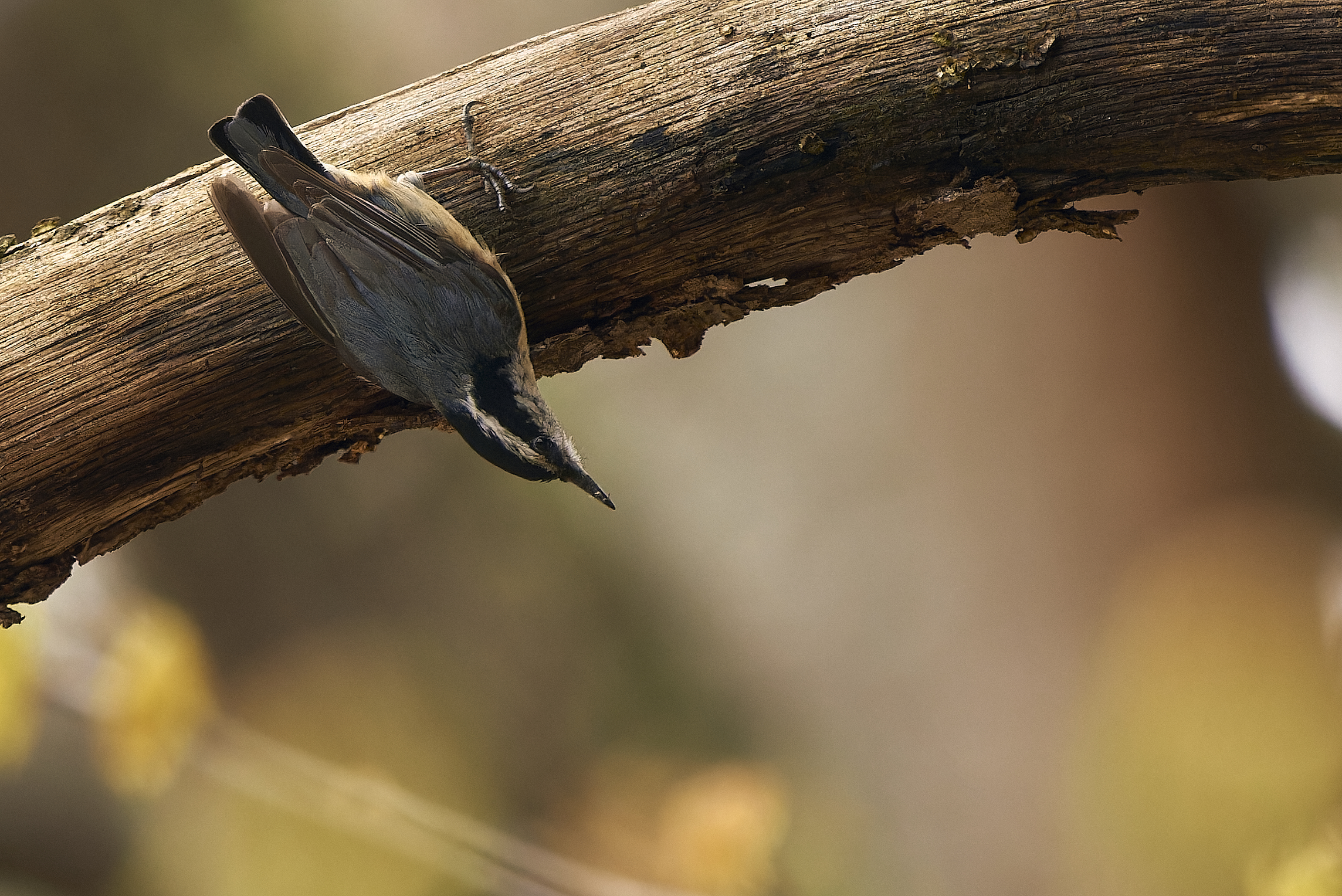
Red-breasted nuthatch

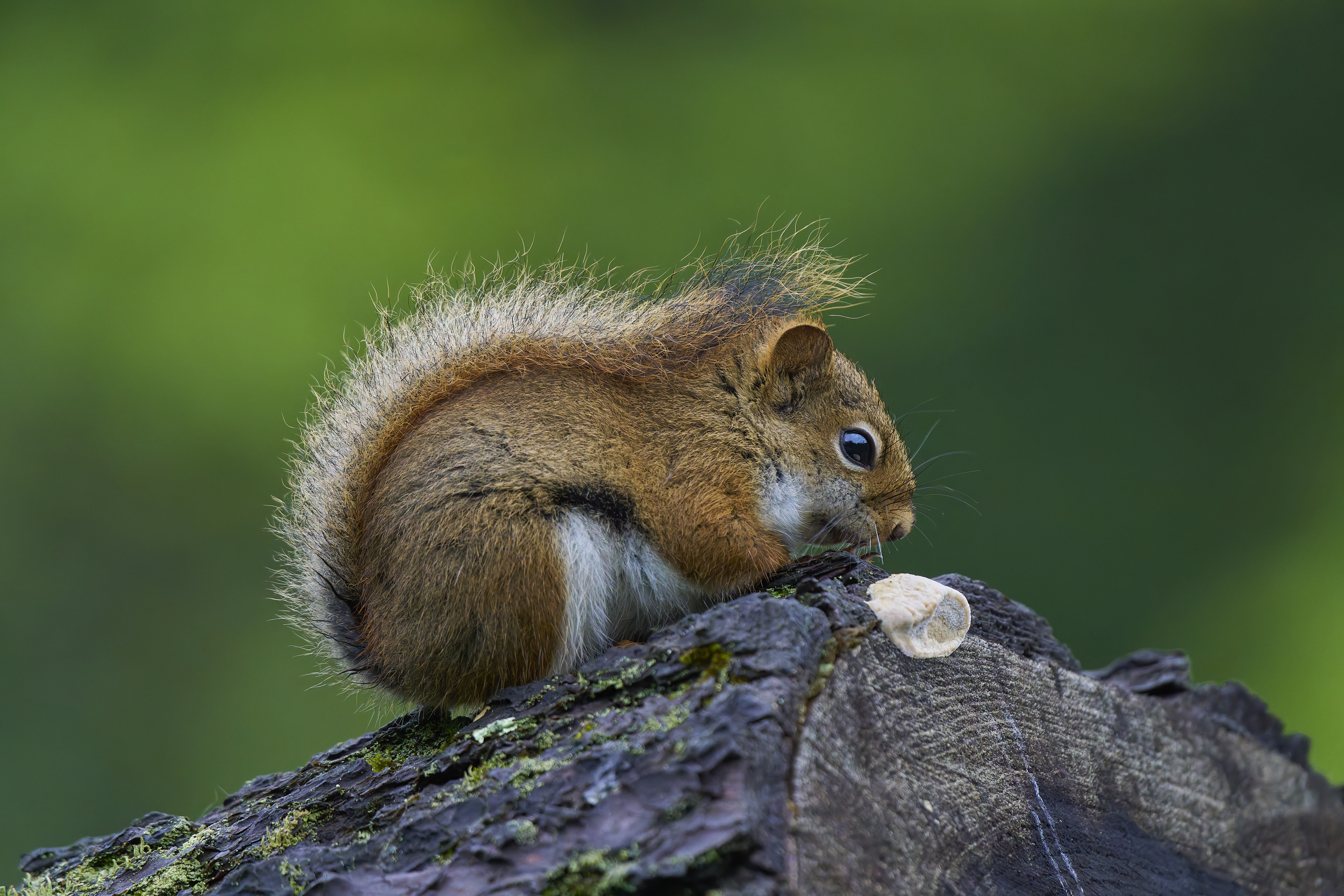
American red squirrel

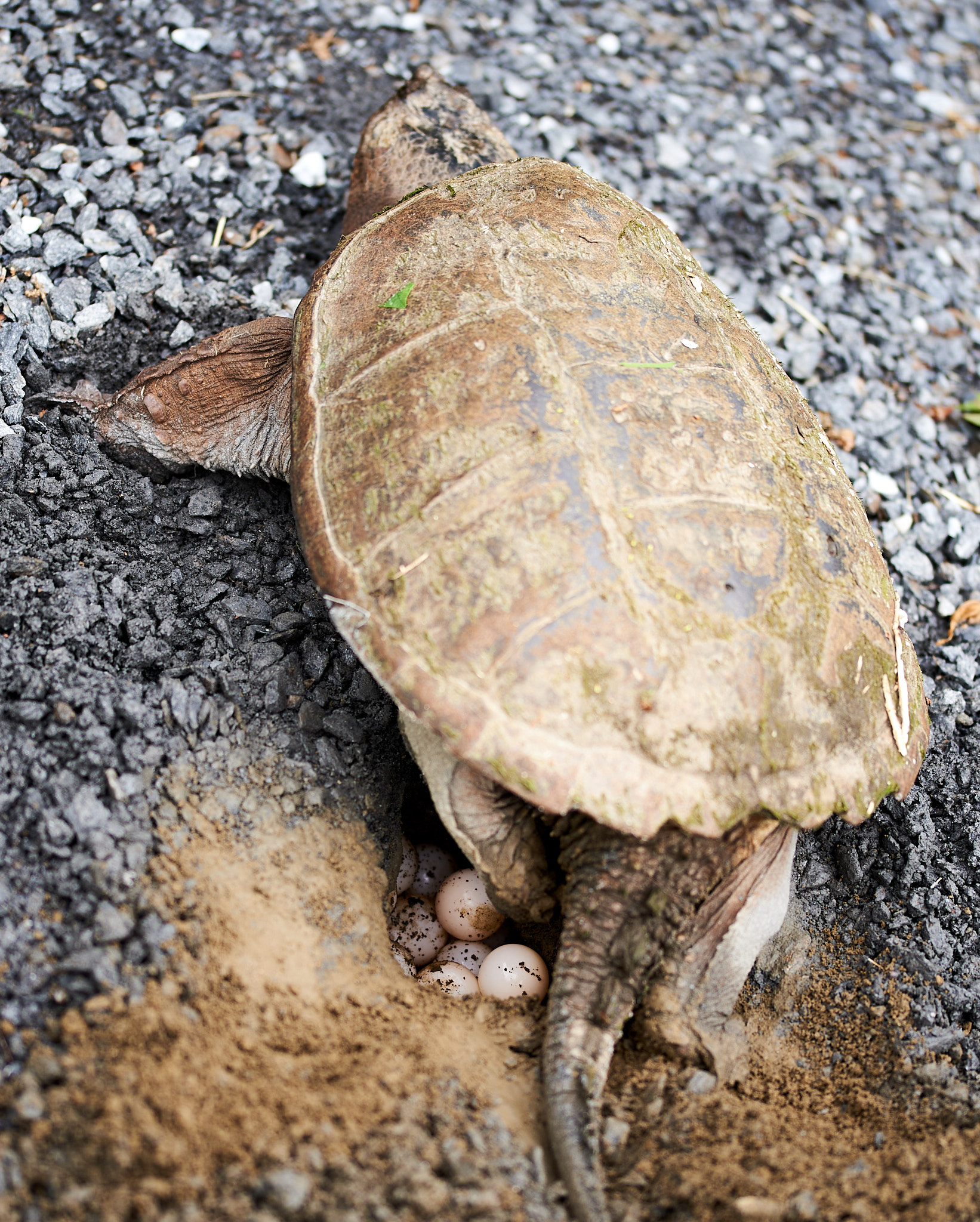
Snapping turtle laying eggs

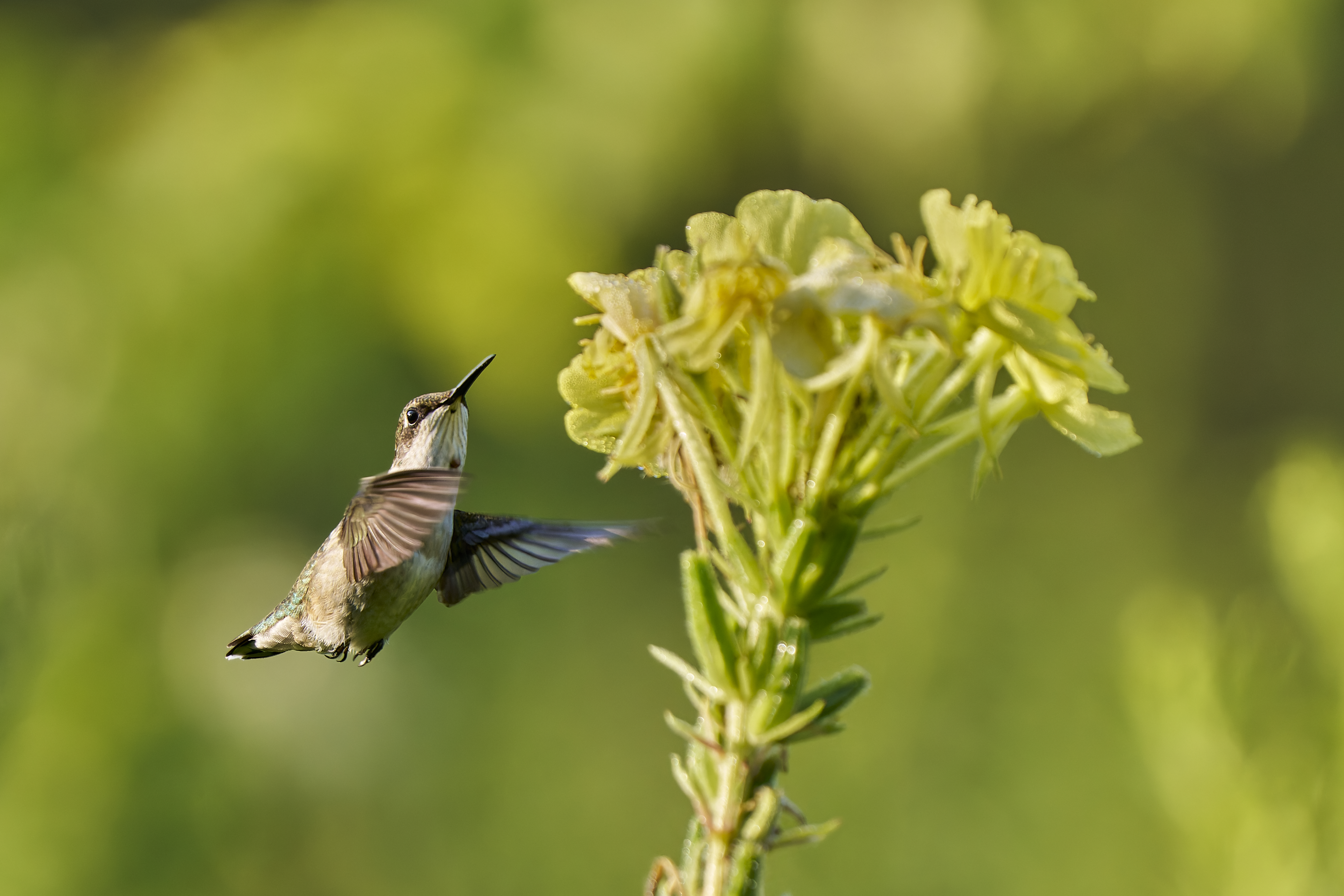
Ruby-throated Hummingbird

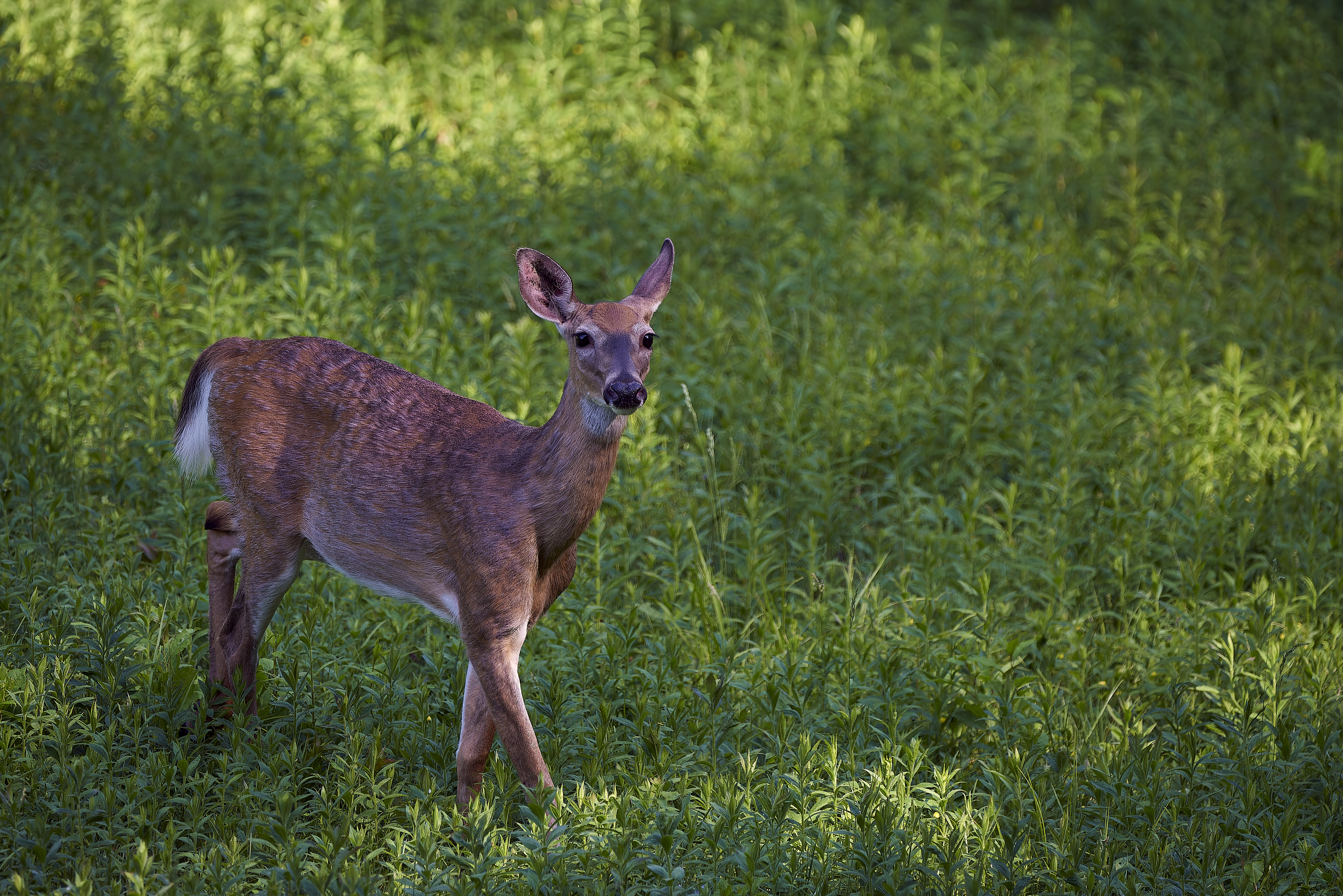
White-tailed Deer

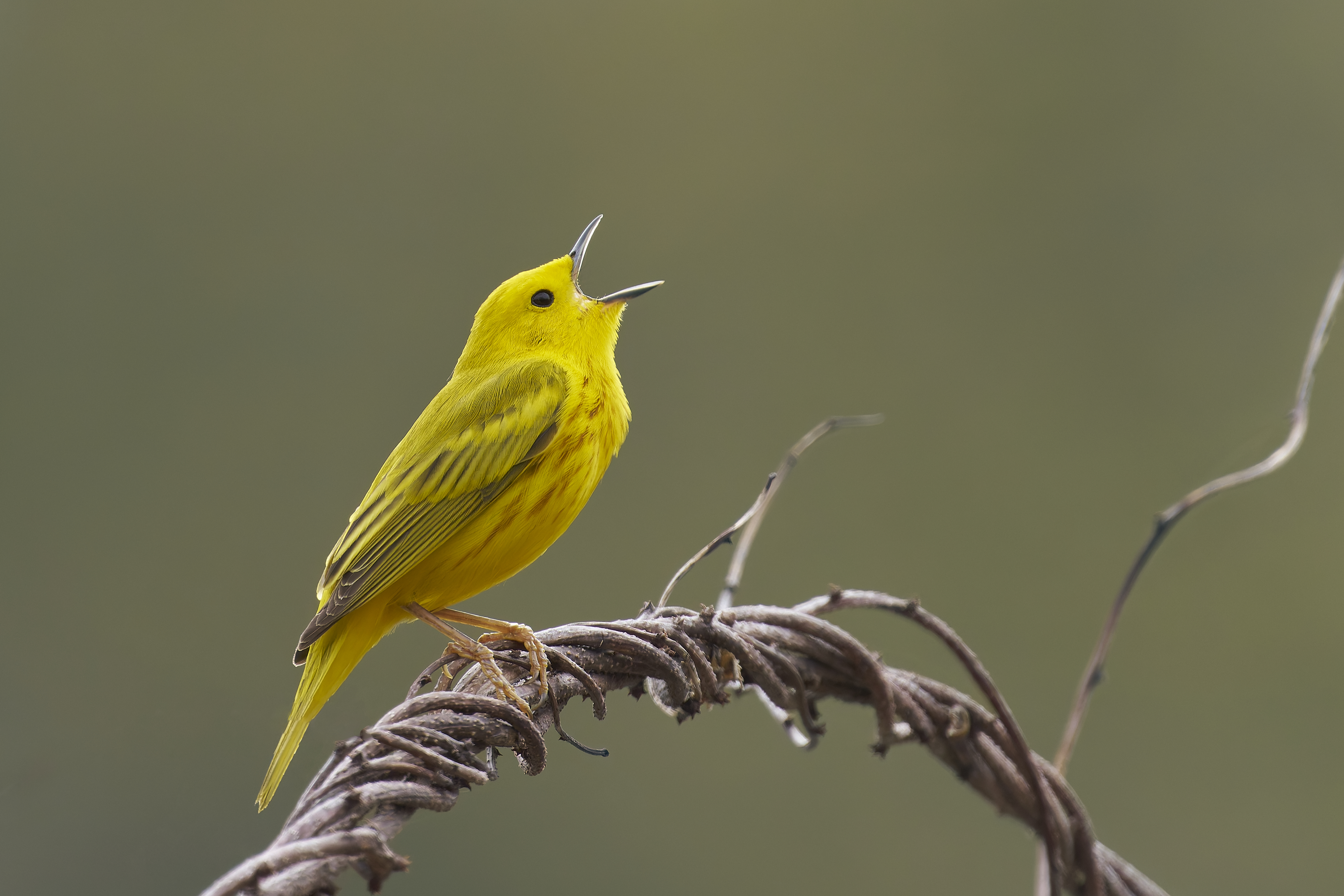
Yellow Warbler vocalizing

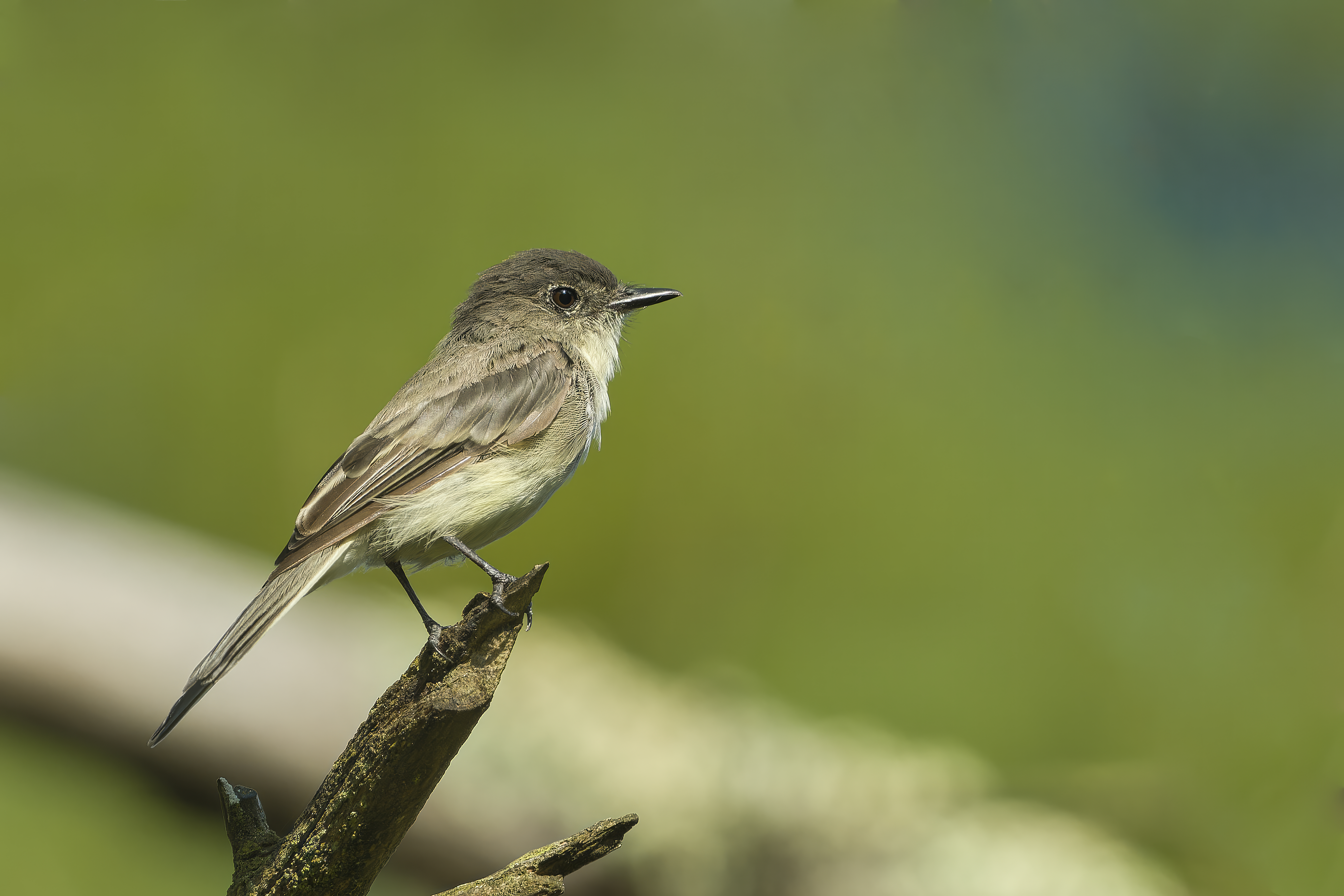
Eastern Phoebe

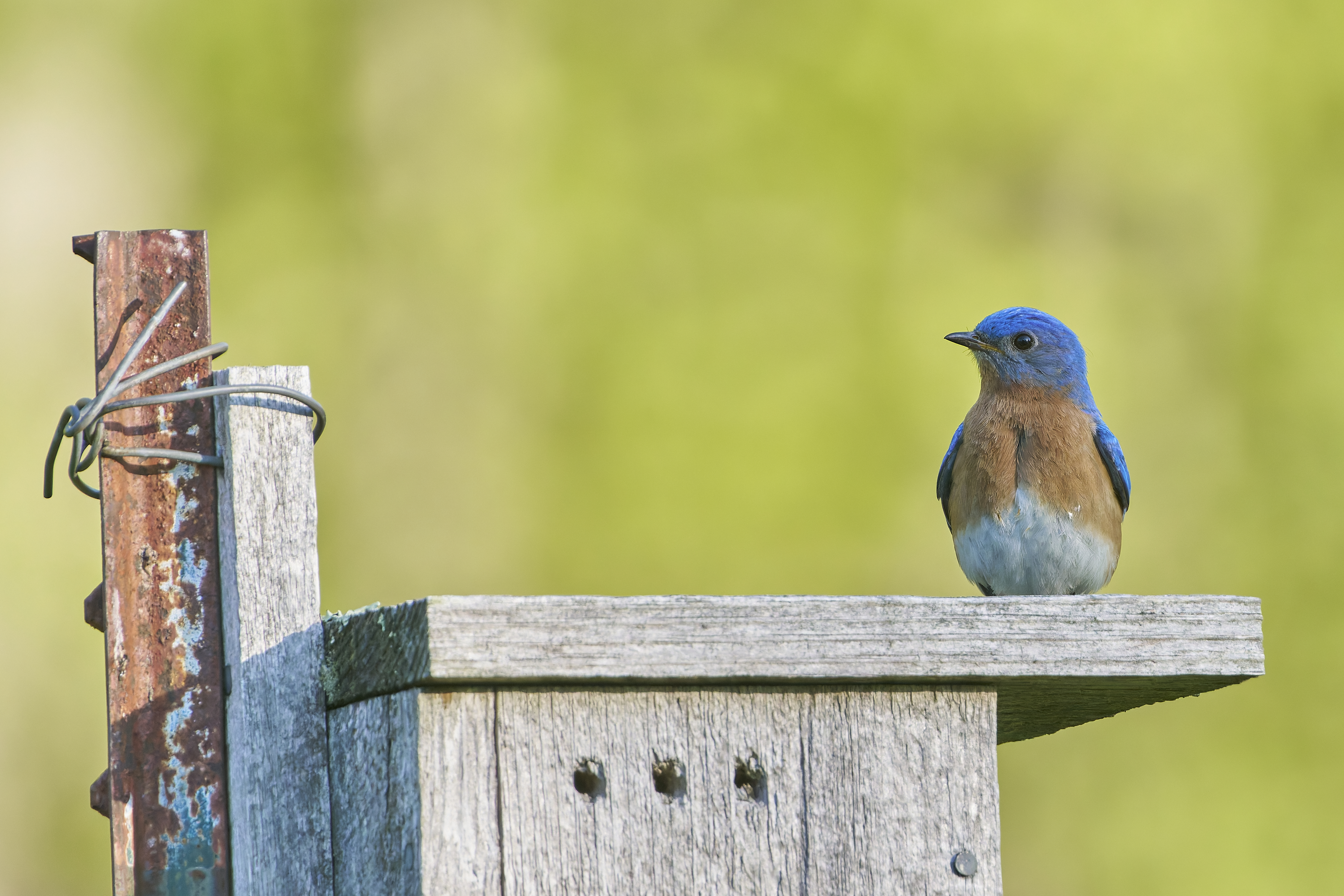
Eastern Bluebird on a nest box
