= Reinventing Eden =

2003 non-fiction book

Reinventing Eden: The Fate of Nature in Western Culture
- Author: Carolyn Merchant
- Language: English
- Genre: Non-fiction
- Publisher: Routledge
- Publication date: 2003

Reinventing Eden: The Fate of Nature in Western Culture is a non-fiction environmental book by Carolyn Merchant, an American ecofeminist philosopher and historian of science. First published in 2003 by Routledge, the book is about the myth of the Garden of Eden shown from scholarly, broad perspectives, tracing its religious, feministic, and environmental aspects.

The book is divided into three parts, "Genesis of the Recovery Narrative," "New World Edens," and "New Stories." In each part, Merchant discusses the Recovery Narrative stating that it is "the mainstream narrative of Western culture." Her own perspective reveals that while progressive and declensionist narratives provide actual historical events, they present them from dissimilar viewpoints. She hopes that people would start to consider themselves as not in control of nature or nature in control of them, but "rather in dynamic relationship to nature as its partner." Two plots of the Recovery Narrative, such as the progress and the decline, continue to form the earth and the human emotions and wishes. Through the book, Merchant proposes different ways to create a relationship between humans and nature. The book received various reviews and is continuously being mentioned in other scholarly works.

== Reception ==
The book was thoroughly reviewed and used as a source in academic articles and essays by scholars specializing in the fields of Ecology, Environmental Studies, Philosophy and others.

Ryszard F. Sadowski, an academic whose work particularly focuses on Environmental Anthropology, Ecophilosophy, Religion and Ecology, has referenced the book "Reinventing Eden: The Fate of Nature in Western Culture" in his academic article "Roots of (and Solutions to) Our Ecological Crisis. A Humanistic Perspective." Describing the causes of the ecological crisis and discussing their possible solutions as a specialist and a professional, Sadowski refers to Merchant in the third section of the article named "Modern Causes of the Ecological Crisis." In the last paragraph of the section, the author brings in Merchant's point from her book and discusses how people in this day and age see their autonomy from the world through technology, making private property and personal profit a priority, which brought them to exploiting nature, causing the environmental crisis.

Jonna Higgins-Freese, an environmentalist, has written a review on the book, analyzing how it can have an influence on the environmental narrative, reshaping our thinking and understanding of the environmental issues. The author discusses both the influential and the weaker aspects of the book, drawing parallels with other works and philosophies on this topic. "Some of her conclusions may be too far-reaching. I wasn't convinced that the notion of upward progress in Western thought always equates to desire for a "return" to the garden," the specialist says, "...still, Merchant's analysis is compelling, particularly if enviros use it consciously to craft more effective environmental messages." With this, the author both recognizes the potential functionality of Merchant's arguments, if used cleverly and strategically by the professionals, while also acknowledging that some of the parts of the work are not persuasive enough in and of itself.

Another reviewer David Nye analyzed how "Reinventing Eden: The Fate of Nature in Western Culture" does not only explore the idea of humans being partners with nature, rather devotes itself to "the fate of nature in western culture." At first, Nye wrote about the overall structure of the book and what each chapter is about. Nye wrote that Merchant imagines a future where "environmentalists, feminists, and philosophers write new narratives that politicians and economists accept as guiding principles," questioning whether it's more of an illusion. He considered Merchant's book "derivative history of ideas" that presents the historical and scientific advancements as linear processes neglecting the earlier centuries' opposition to the progressive narrative. He concluded his review by stating that the book disappointed him because it "preaches to the choir."

Professor Emeritus John F Disinger's combined review of Jack M. Hollander's "The Real Environmental Crisis: Why Poverty, Not Affluence, is the Environment's Number One Enemy" and Merchant's book. While comparing them, Disinger mentions that both authors analyze their topics without interfering with each other. He claims that it would not be critical to think of Hollander "as a technological optimist looking at the world through rose-colored glasses, or Merchant as an ecofeminist-pessimist." Disinger thinks that both authors thoroughly explain the issues regarding the environment and even leave room for the reader to ponder and interpret the text differently. Ultimately, he advises college undergraduates to read both books simultaneously, with lively debates that will allow them to dive deeper into the texts.

Paula DiPerna, a writer, explains Merchant's three narrative structures and its theoretical frameworks. DiPerna claims that Merchant viewed the Eden story through multiple perspectives: biblical, historical, capitalistic. The review shows the book's advantages and disadvantages. While she admires how Merchant historically described and analyzed the myth of Eden, she criticizes other aspects. She says "but her 'third way' is like too many such long utopian expositions and short on ways to get there." DiPerna means that Merchant's ideas are well analyzed but idealistic. Like many other books it is focused on describing the issue, rather than finding ways to solve it and make it more real.
