= Bechara Choucair =

Lebanese-American physician

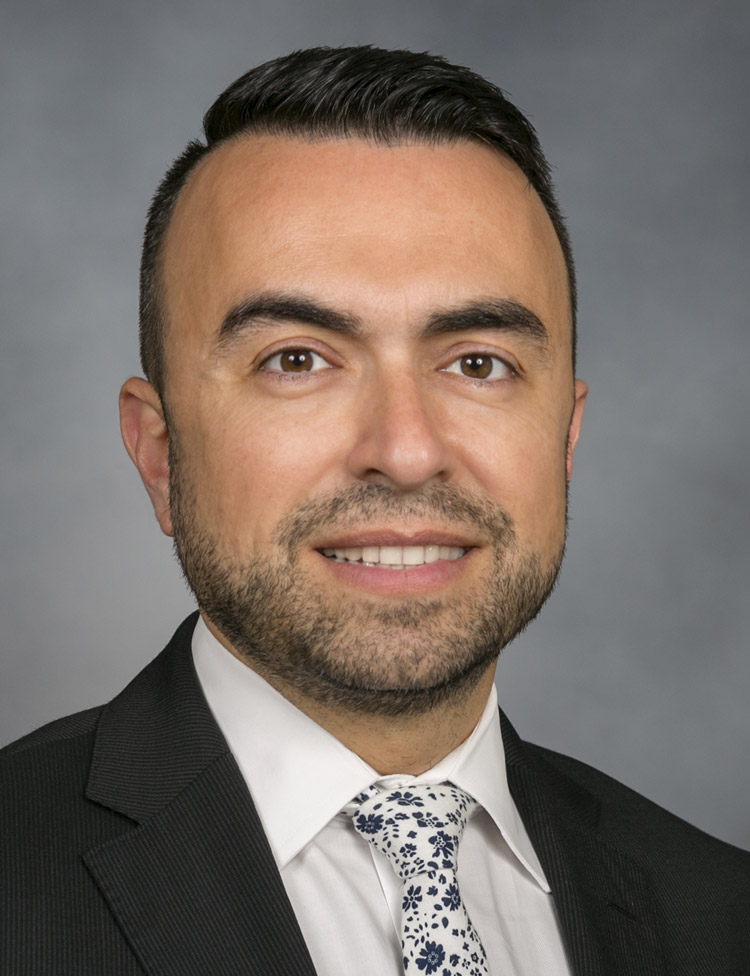

White House Vaccinations Coordinator
- In office January 20, 2021 – November 22, 2021
- President: Joe Biden
- Preceded by: Position established

Personal details
- Born: 1973 or 1974 (age 51–52) Beirut, Lebanon
- Education: American University of Beirut (BS, MD); University of Texas, Dallas (MS)

Bechara Choucair (Arabic: بشارة شقير) is a Lebanese-American physician and public health advisor who is the chief community health officer of Kaiser Permanente. He was the senior vice president of safety net and community health at Trinity Health and served as the commissioner of the Chicago Department of Public Health from 2009 to 2014.

== Early life and education ==
Choucair was born in Beirut. He earned a Bachelor of Science in chemistry and Doctor of Medicine from the American University of Beirut. He then earned a Master of Science degree in healthcare management from the University of Texas at Dallas.

== Career ==
=== Chicago Department of Public Health ===
Choucair was appointed as commissioner of the Chicago Department of Public Health on November 25, 2009, by Richard M. Daley, and reappointed by Rahm Emanuel upon his election. He stepped down from the post in December 2014.

Together with Mayor Emanuel, Choucair launched Healthy Chicago in August 2011, the City's first comprehensive public health agenda. in different Chicago neighborhoods.

Choucair previously held an appointment at Feinberg School of Medicine as an adjunct associate professor in the Department of Family and Community Medicine.

=== Kaiser ===
Choucair was chief community health officer for Kaiser Permanente.

In April 2018, Choucair led the mission-based nonprofit organization's commitment of $2 million to researching gun injury prevention. As part of this public health initiative, Choucair serves as a co-lead on the Kaiser Permanente Taskforce on Firearm Injury Prevention.

In May 2018, Choucair announced Kaiser Permanente's $200 million impact investing commitment to address affordable housing and prevent displacement, a precursor to homelessness.

=== Biden administration ===
On December 30, 2020, it was announced that Choucair would serve as White House Vaccinations Coordinator in the incoming Biden administration. Choucair stepped down from his role on November 22, 2021, and resumed his role at Kaiser Permanente on December 27, 2021.

== Awards ==
- 2010, Community Leadership Award, Midwest Asian Health Association
- 2011, Healthcare Community Leadership Award, The Chicago Health Executives Forum
- 2012, Friend for Life Award, Howard Brown Health Center
- 2012, Chicago's "40 under 40," Crain's Chicago Business
- 2014, Housing Champion Award, Metropolitan Tenants Organization
- 2019, named sixty-eighth among the 100 Most Influential People in Healthcare by Modern Healthcare.

== Select publications ==
  - Survey of a Bekaa Community Health Needs, LMJ 47:1:13-17, 1999, Jamal N, Choucair B, Khalil H, Hamadeh G.
  - Health Care for the Homeless in America, Am Fam Physician, 2006 Oct 1;74(7):1132-8.
  - Homelessness and Healthcare: Considerations for Evaluation, Management, and Support within the Primary Care Domain, Disease-a-Month, 2010 Dec 56(12):719-733. Koon A, Kantayya V, Choucair B.
  - Program to Improve Colorectal Cancer Screening in Low-Income, Racially Diverse Population: A Randomized Controlled Trial, Annals of Family Medicine, 2012 Sept/October 10 (5): 412-417. Jean-Jacques M., Kaleba E., Gatta J., Gracia G., Ryan E., Choucair, B.
  - Chicago Health Atlas: Engaging in Public Health Surveillance Beyond the Confines of the Local Health Department, NACCHO Exchange, winter 2013 12(1). Jones R, Choucair B., O’Neil D., Kho A. Regional Extension Center.
- Select Abstracts
  - An Innovative Governmental Approach to Childhood Obesity Prevention in Chicago: The Inter-Departmental Task Force on Childhood Obesity, 2010. American Public Health Association 138th Annual Meeting and Expo. Choucair B, Harrington J, Herd J, Becker A, Bozlak C.
  - Poverty Medicine Collaborative: Global Health Experience for Medical Students. 2008. American Academy of Family Physicians Global Health Conference. Choucair B, Koon A.
