= Joyce Foundation =

American charitable foundation

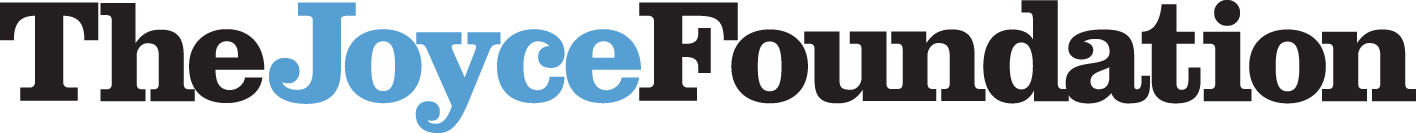
- Named after: The Joyce family
- Formation: 1948
- Founder: Beatrice Joyce Kean
- Type: Non-operating private foundation
- Legal status: 501(c)(3) organization
- Purpose: Education, environment, employment, culture, democracy, and gun-violence prevention
- Location: Chicago, Illinois
- Region served: Great Lakes region, U.S.
- Method: Grants
- Key people: Julie Morita, president
- Endowment: $1.24 billion
- Website: joycefdn.org

The Joyce Foundation is a non-operating private foundation based in Chicago, Illinois. As of 2025, it had assets of approximately $1.24 billion.

Former U.S. President Barack Obama served on the foundation's board of directors from 1994 through 2002. The Joyce Foundation is notable for its support of gun control measures.

== History ==
The Joyce Foundation was established in 1948 by Beatrice Joyce Kean of Chicago. She was the sole heir of David Joyce, a lumber executive and industrialist from Clinton, Iowa. The family wealth came from the lumber industry, including family-owned timberlands, plywood and saw mills, and wholesale and retail building material distribution facilities located in the Midwest, Louisiana, and Texas. The Foundation was modestly endowed until Kean's death in 1972, when she bequeathed it nearly $100 million.

Charles U. Daly, a former aide to President John F. Kennedy, served as president of the Foundation for eight years. He was succeeded by Craig Kennedy in 1986. Deborah Leff, a trial lawyer for the civil rights division of the Department of Justice, served as president of the organization from 1992 to 1999, and was succeeded by Paula DiPerna, named president in 1999. DiPerna was succeeded in 2002 by Ellen S. Alberding, the organization's seventh president. Former U.S. President Barack Obama served on the foundation's board of directors from 1994 through 2002.

The Joyce Foundation is one of the few private foundations that considers gun violence related research proposals. Joyce distributes grants designed to prevent gun violence by reducing the accessibility of firearms. Since 1993, the Joyce Foundation spent over $54 million on over 100 grants that favor gun control.
