= Sheffield, Massachusetts =

- Town
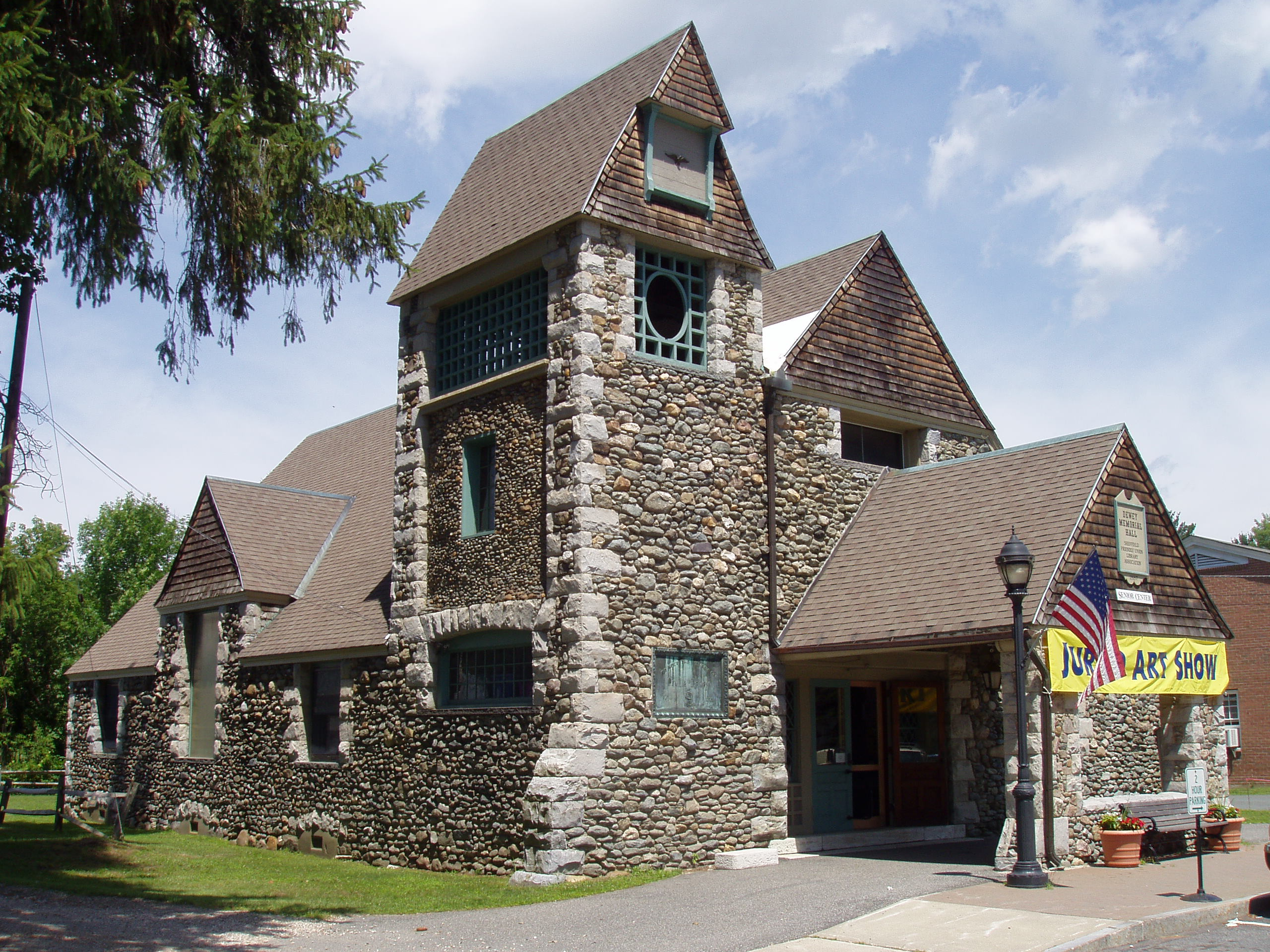
- Dewey Memorial Hall

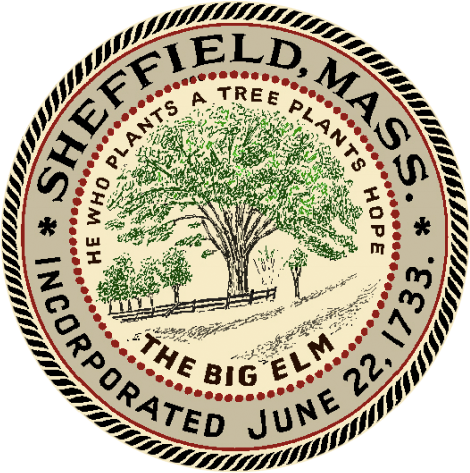
- Seal
- Motto: "He Who Plants a Tree Plants Hope"
- Location in Berkshire County and the state of Massachusetts.
- Coordinates: 42°06′37″N 73°21′20″W
- Country: United States
- State: Massachusetts
- County: Berkshire
- Settled: 1725
- Incorporated: 1733

Government
  - Type: Open town meeting

Area
  - Total: 48.6 sq mi (125.8 km^{2})
  - Land: 47.5 sq mi (122.9 km^{2})
  - Water: 1.1 sq mi (2.9 km^{2})
- Elevation: 676 ft (206 m)

Population (2020)
  - Total: 3,327
  - Density: 70.11/sq mi (27.07/km^{2})
- Time zone: UTC−5 (Eastern)
  - Summer (DST): UTC−4 (Eastern)
- ZIP Codes: 01222 (Ashley Falls); 01230 (Great Barrington); 01257 (Sheffield)
- Area code: 413
- FIPS code: 25-61065
- GNIS feature ID: 0619428
- Website: www.sheffieldma.gov

Sheffield is a town in Berkshire County, Massachusetts, United States. It is part of the Pittsfield Metropolitan Statistical Area. The population was 3,327 at the 2020 census. Sheffield is home to Berkshire School, a private preparatory school. The former resort town includes the village of Ashley Falls, and is bordered by various other towns and villages, such as Egremont and Great Barrington. Its southern border is the Massachusetts-Connecticut state line.

== History ==
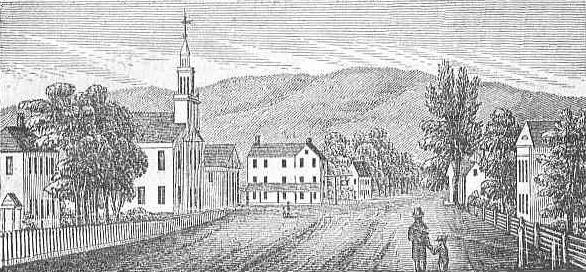
View of Sheffield in 1839

The land was purchased on April 25, 1724, from Chief Konkapot and 20 other Stockbridge Mahican Native Americans. Its price was 460 pounds, 3 barrels of cider and 30 quarts of rum. The lower township of Housatonic (as Outhotonnook would be corrupted) was first settled by Matthew Noble of Westfield, who arrived in 1725.

But New York claimed the land west of the Housatonic River under the Westenhook Patent, dated July 11, 1705, and insisted that Massachusetts cease encroachment. Indeed, one early settler was arrested and incarcerated at Albany as a trespasser on Westenhook land. Nevertheless, Sheffield, Massachusetts, was officially incorporated on June 22, 1733, the first town incorporated in what is now Berkshire County. Its north parish was set off and incorporated as Great Barrington in 1761. Located on the fertile floodplain of the Housatonic River valley, the principal industry was agriculture.

The Sheffield Resolves, or Sheffield Declaration, was an early Colonial American petition against British rule and manifesto for individual rights, drawn up as a series of resolves approved by the Town of Sheffield on January 12, 1773, and printed in The Massachusetts Spy, Or, Thomas's Boston Journal on February 18, 1773. Sheffield was also the site of the bloodiest (and last) battle on February 27, 1787, during Shays' Rebellion.

== Geography ==
According to the United States Census Bureau, the town has a total area of 48.6 square miles (125.8 km^{2}), of which 47.5 square miles (122.9 km^{2}) is land and 1.1 square miles (2.9 km^{2}), or 2.33%, is water. Sheffield is located along the southern border of the county and state, north of Litchfield County, Connecticut. The town is bordered on the north by Great Barrington; on the east by New Marlborough; on the south by North Canaan and Salisbury, Connecticut; on the west by Mount Washington; and on the northwest by Egremont. Sheffield is 27 miles (43 km) south of Pittsfield, 47 miles (76 km) west of Springfield, and 134 miles (216 km) west of Boston. The extreme southern portion of Sheffield, on Route 41, is just under 100 miles (160 km) away from the northern edge of Central Park, New York City.

The town is in the Housatonic River valley and several brooks as well as the Konkapot River flow into the river within the town's borders, with several falls along these rivers, including Ashley Falls near the state border. To the northeast, the peak of East Mountain lies just over the Great Barrington border, and the mountain's south slope and part of its state forest lie within town borders. Several hills also dot the area south of this, along the New Marlborough town line. To the west, Mount Everett, part of the Taconic Range, peaks in the town of Mount Washington and slopes eastward into the town. Part of the Mount Everett State Reservation and Mount Washington State Forest also crosses into town. The Appalachian Trail crosses the northern third of town as it heads north from Mount Everett to East Mountain.

Sheffield lies along U.S. Route 7, which divides the town roughly in half. The southernmost section of Massachusetts Route 7A lies within the town, starting between the town center and Ashley Falls and extending over the Connecticut state border as an unnumbered road before reconnecting with the highway. Massachusetts Route 41 also ends at the town's southern border, heading from Egremont along the western part of town to the state border, where it becomes Connecticut Route 41. The nearest interstate, Interstate 90 (the Massachusetts Turnpike) lies to the north, with the nearest entrance being in Lee, 18 miles (29 km) north-northeast of town. The town also lies along the Housatonic Railroad line, which extends autumn service between New York and Great Barrington along a line of the MTA. Otherwise, Amtrak service can be reached in Pittsfield, and bus service can be reached in Great Barrington. The nearest small airport can be found in Great Barrington, and the nearest national air service is at Bradley International Airport in Windsor Locks, Connecticut.

== Demographics ==
Historical population
Year	Pop.	±%
1790	1,899	—
1850	2,769	+45.8%
1860	2,621	−5.3%
1870	2,535	−3.3%
1880	2,204	−13.1%
1890	1,954	−11.3%
1900	1,804	−7.7%
1910	1,817	+0.7%
1920	1,435	−21.0%
1930	1,650	+15.0%
1940	1,709	+3.6%
1950	2,150	+25.8%
1960	2,138	−0.6%
1970	2,374	+11.0%
1980	2,743	+15.5%
1990	2,910	+6.1%
2000	3,335	+14.6%
2010	3,257	−2.3%
2020	3,327	+2.1%
2022*	3,329	+0.1%
* = population estimate. Source: United States census records and Population Estimates Program data.

As of the census of 2010, there were 3,257 people, 1,424 households, and 879 families residing in the town. By population, Sheffield ranked tenth out of the 32 cities and towns in Berkshire County, and 269th out of 351 cities and towns in Massachusetts. The population density was 67.2 inhabitants per square mile (25.9/km^{2}), which ranks 17th in the county and 301st in the Commonwealth. There were 1,751 housing units at an average density of 36.1 per square mile (13.9/km^{2}). The racial makeup of the town was 95.8% White, 1.1% African American, 0.2% Native American, 0.3% Asian, 1.3% from other races, and 1.3% from two or more races. Hispanic or Latino of any race were 3.2% of the population.

There were 1,424 households, out of which 24.8% had children under the age of 18 living with them, 49.8% were married couples living together, 7.7% had a female householder with no husband present, and 38.3% were non-families. 31.1% of all households were made up of individuals, and 13.3% had someone living alone who was 65 years of age or older. The average household size was 2.28 and the average family size was 2.87.

In the town, the population was spread out, with 18.9% under the age of 18, 6.1% from 18 to 24, 19.7% from 25 to 44, 35.9% from 45 to 64, and 19.4% who were 65 years of age or older. The median age was 48 years. For every 100 females, there were 94.8 males. For every 100 females age 18 and over, there were 96.2 males.

In 2000, the median income for a household in the town was $45,082, and the median income for a family was $50,944. Males had a median income of $36,016 versus $25,833 for females. The per capita income for the town was $25,492. About 3.9% of families and 5.3% of the population were below the poverty line, including 3.3% of those under age 18 and 4.7% of those age 65 or over. (Data is not yet available for 2010.)

== Government ==
Sheffield employs the open town meeting form of government, and is led by a board of selectmen and a town administrator. The town operates its own services, including police, fire and public works departments, as well as a senior center and animal control officers. The town library, the Bushnell-Sage Library, was founded in 1901 and is connected to the regional library system. The nearest hospital, Fairview Hospital, is located in neighboring Great Barrington.

On the state level, Sheffield is represented in the Massachusetts House of Representatives by the Fourth Berkshire district, which covers southern Berkshire County, as well as the westernmost towns in Hampden County. In the Massachusetts Senate, the town is represented by the Berkshire, Hampshire and Franklin district, which includes all of Berkshire County and western Hampshire and Franklin counties. The town is patrolled by the First (Lee) Station of Barracks "B" of the Massachusetts State Police.

On the national level, Sheffield is represented in the United States House of Representatives as part of Massachusetts's 1st congressional district, and has been represented by Richard Neal of Springfield, Massachusetts since 2013. Massachusetts is currently represented in the United States Senate by senior Senator Elizabeth Warren and junior Senator Ed Markey.

Sheffield presidential election results
Year	Democratic	Republican	Third parties	Total Votes	Margin
2024	67.34% 1,373	28.05% 572	3.68% 75	2,039	39.28%
2020	71.32% 1,542	26.73% 578	1.94% 42	2,162	44.59%
2016	64.86% 1,242	27.68% 530	7.47% 143	1,915	37.18%
2012	70.35% 1,291	27.41% 503	2.23% 41	1,835	42.94%
2008	72.87% 1,378	23.90% 452	3.23% 61	1,891	48.97%
2004	66.58% 1,211	31.50% 573	1.92% 35	1,819	35.07%
2000	54.86% 869	33.52% 531	11.62% 184	1,584	21.34%
1996	54.15% 841	30.71% 477	15.13% 235	1,553	23.44%
1992	41.42% 659	33.00% 525	25.58% 407	1,591	8.42%
1988	45.07% 635	53.44% 753	1.49% 21	1,409	8.37%
1984	33.03% 471	66.55% 949	0.42% 6	1,426	33.52%
1980	31.79% 438	51.31% 707	16.91% 233	1,378	19.52%
1976	39.56% 517	56.39% 737	4.06% 53	1,307	16.83%
1972	31.57% 381	67.61% 816	0.83% 10	1,207	36.04%
1968	31.91% 321	61.73% 621	6.36% 64	1,006	29.82%
1964	57.62% 556	41.87% 404	0.52% 5	965	15.75%
1960	30.87% 313	68.93% 699	0.20% 2	1,014	38.07%
1956	17.48% 172	82.22% 809	0.30% 3	984	64.74%
1952	19.84% 193	79.96% 778	0.21% 2	973	60.12%
1948	22.24% 183	76.06% 626	1.70% 14	823	53.83%
1944	30.44% 221	69.42% 504	0.14% 1	726	38.98%
1940	30.30% 243	69.45% 557	0.25% 2	802	39.15%

== Education ==
Sheffield is part of the Southern Berkshire Regional School District along with Alford, Egremont, Monterey, Mount Washington, and New Marlborough. Students in these five towns can attend South Egremont School for Pre-K, New Marlborough Central School for Pre-k-grade 3, and Undermountain Elementary School in Sheffield for Pre-K-grade 5. Mount Everett Regional High School, also in Sheffield, is the middle school and high school serving grades 7–12. The school's athletics teams are known as the Eagles, and the school colors are blue and gold. The town is also home to the Berkshire School, a private, co-educational boarding school serving grades nine through twelve. There are also other private schools in Great Barrington.

The nearest community college is the South County Center of Berkshire Community College in Great Barrington. The nearest state college is Westfield State University. The nearest private colleges are Williams College in Williamstown in addition to University of Saint Joseph and University of Hartford, both located in West Hartford, Connecticut.

== Sites of interest ==
- Bartholomew's Cobble
- Berkshire School
- Colonel John Ashley House
- Dewey Memorial Hall
- Old Covered Bridge
- Sheffield Historical Society & Museum
- Shays Rebellion Memorial Monument
- Our Lady of the Valley Church
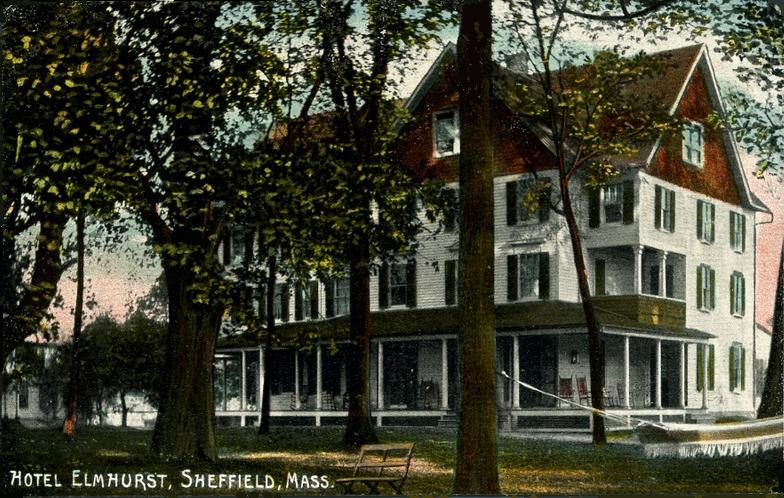
Hotel Elmhurst in 1909

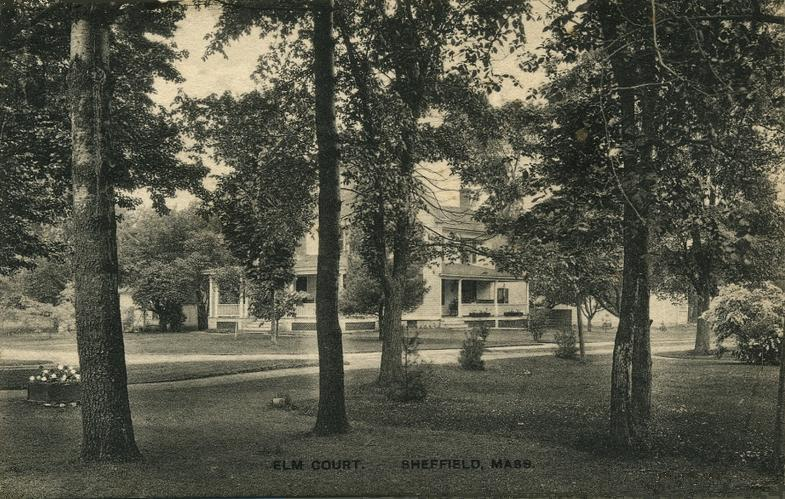
Elm Court in 1920

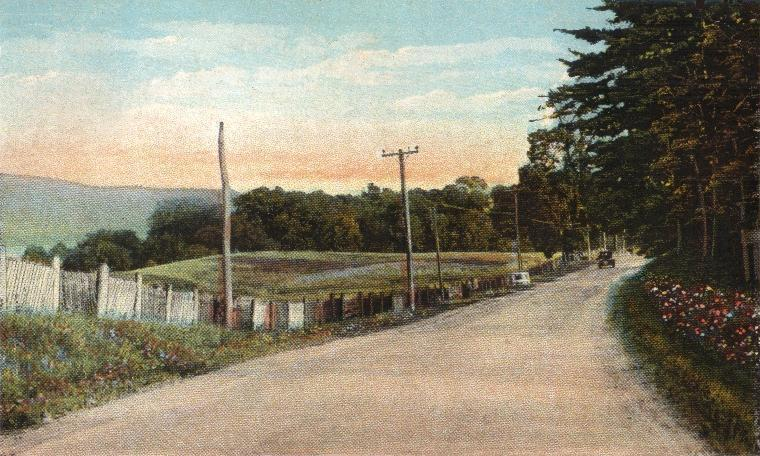
Scene near Sheffield, c. 1920

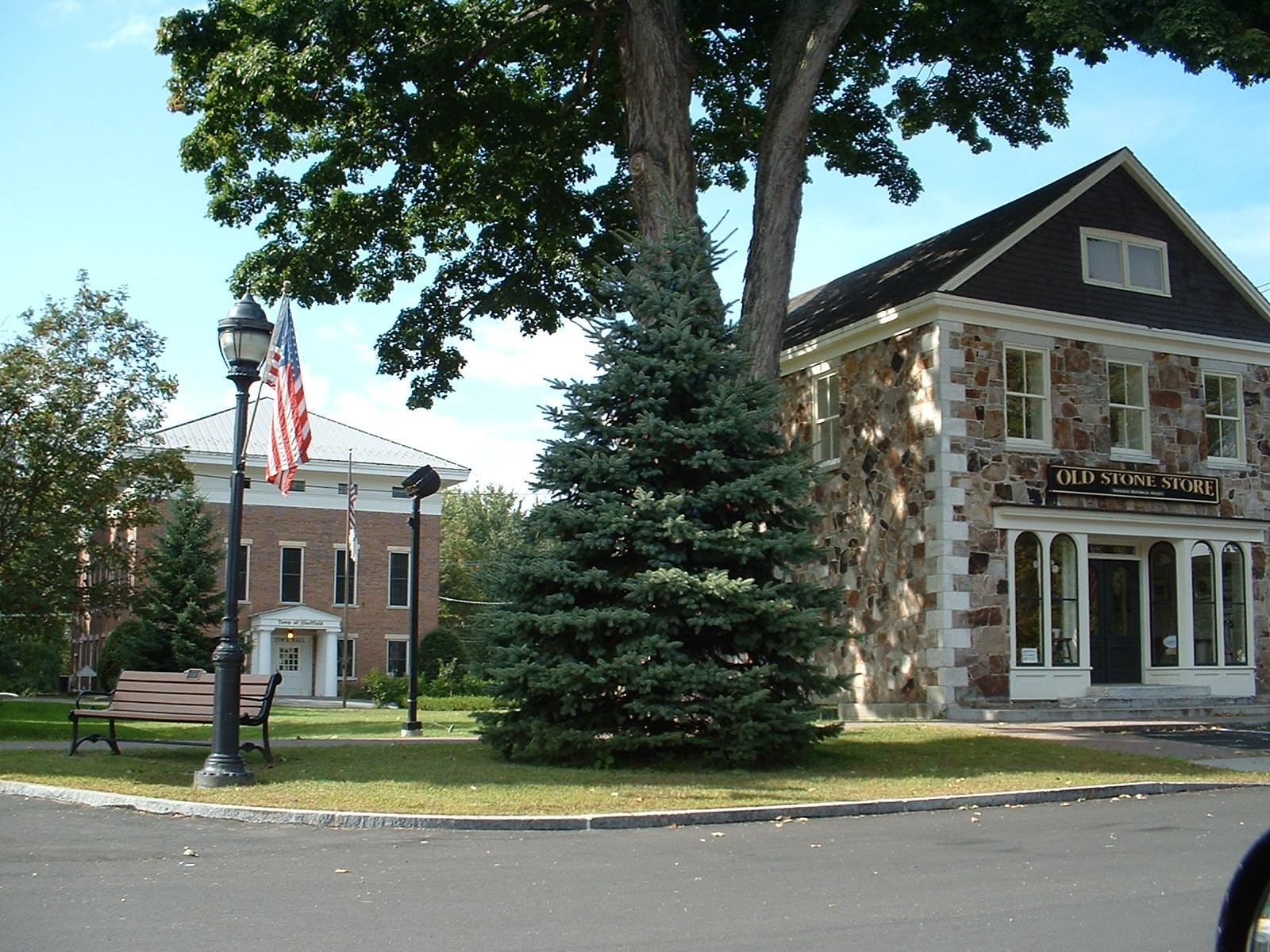
Sheffield Town Hall and the Old Stone Store

== Notable people ==
- Ethan Allen, revolutionary
- Andy Bachetti, racing driver
- Daniel D. Barnard, US congressman
- Frederick Augustus Porter Barnard, scientist and educator
- John G. Barnard, army engineering officer
- Emma Curtiss Bascom, educator, suffragist and reformer
- John C. Crosby, politician
- Sidney Curtiss, politician
- Charles Dewey, Justice of the Indiana Supreme Court
- Orville Dewey, minister
- Grandison Fairchild, college founder
- Elizabeth Freeman, enslaved woman known as "Mum Bett," who sued and won her freedom in 1781
- John Z. Goodrich, politician
- Sophia Curtiss Hoffman, philanthropist
- Wanda Toscanini Horowitz, daughter of Arturo Toscanini and widow of Vladimir Horowitz
- Stephen Jacob, Justice of the Vermont Supreme Court
- Ahmad Jamal, jazz pianist
- David Joyce, industrialist
- Charles Kellogg, congressman
- Nadia Milleron, aviation safety and consumer advocate and independent Congressional candidate
- George Frederick Root, songwriter
- Luella Dowd Smith (1847–1941), writer
