= Chicago Department of Public Health =

Government entity in Chicago, Illinois, US

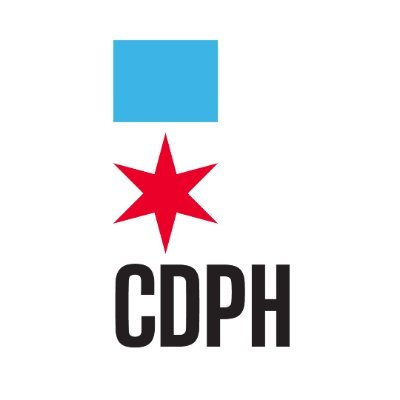

Department overview
- Formed: February 29, 1876; 150 years ago
- Headquarters: 111 W. Washington Street Chicago, Illinois 60602
- Department executive: Dr. Olusimbo "Simbo" Ige, M.D., M.P.H., Commissioner
- Website: www.cityofchicago.org/Health

The Chicago Department of Public Health (CDPH) is a government department of the City of Chicago. The purpose of the CDPH is to create a thriving and healthy community within the city of Chicago, Illinois by providing guidance, services and strategies. This includes promoting values of diversity, excellence, informed decision making, and teamwork within all residents and smaller communities within the city.

== History ==
The Chicago Department of Public Health was established in a 1876 reorganization of the city's health apparatus.

In 1975, the Chicago City Council revised the city's municipal code to make it clear that the nine-member Chicago Board of Health was the policy-making body for health and the Chicago Department of Health is the agency which administers the city's health programs and enforces regulations. Previously, when the Board of Health and Department of Public Health had both been under the leadership of Herman Bundesen, many of their functions merged. This 1976 change to the municipal code reverted that.

The department participated in a series of pandemic preparedness exercises called Crimson Contagion, taking place between August 13 and 16, 2019.

== Leadership ==
- Dr. Olusimbo "Simbo" Ige, M.D., M.P.H. is the Commissioner of Chicago Department of Public Health.
- Janet Lin, M.D. is the President of the Chicago Board of Health.

== Services and programs ==
=== Healthy Chicago 2025 ===
On September 17, 2020, Mayor Lori Lightfoot and Commissioner Allison Arwady, M.D. launched Healthy Chicago 2025. This is Chicago's five-year community health improvement plan that focuses on racial and health equity to meet the goal of reducing the Black-white life expectancy gap.

=== Healthy Chicago 2.0 ===
In 2016, Mayor Rahm Emanuel and Commissioner Julie Morita, M.D. launched Healthy Chicago 2.0, a plan focused on community collaboration and health equity. Healthy Chicago 2.0 plan outlines 82 objectives and over 200 strategies to help reach 30 goals. In order to measure progress towards each goal, the Chicago Department of Public Health and community partners identified 75 indicators to serve as annual benchmarks towards 2020 targets that are posted on the Chicago Health Atlas addressing the following 10 areas:

- Expanding Partnership and Community Engagement
- Addressing Root Causes of Health (economic development, built environment, transportation, climate change, and housing)
- Addressing Education
- Increasing Access to Health and Human Services
- Promoting Behavioral Health
- Strengthening Child & Adolescent Health
- Preventing and Controlling Chronic Disease
- Reducing the Burden of Infectious Disease
- Reducing Violence
- Utilizing and Maximizing Data and Research

=== Healthy Chicago ===
On August 16, 2011, Mayor Rahm Emanuel and Commissioner Bechara Choucair, M.D. unveiled the Healthy Chicago public health agenda with the Chicago Department of Public Health. Healthy Chicago identifies 16 health outcome targets and 12 key priority areas and over 200 supporting strategies including:

- Tobacco Use
- Obesity Prevention
- HIV Prevention
- Adolescent Health
- Cancer Disparities
- Heart Disease & Stroke
- Access to Care
- Healthy Mothers & Babies
- Communicable Disease Control & Prevention
- Healthy Homes
- Violence Prevention
- Public Health Infrastructure

== See also ==
- History of public health in Chicago
