= Julie Morita =

American public health expert

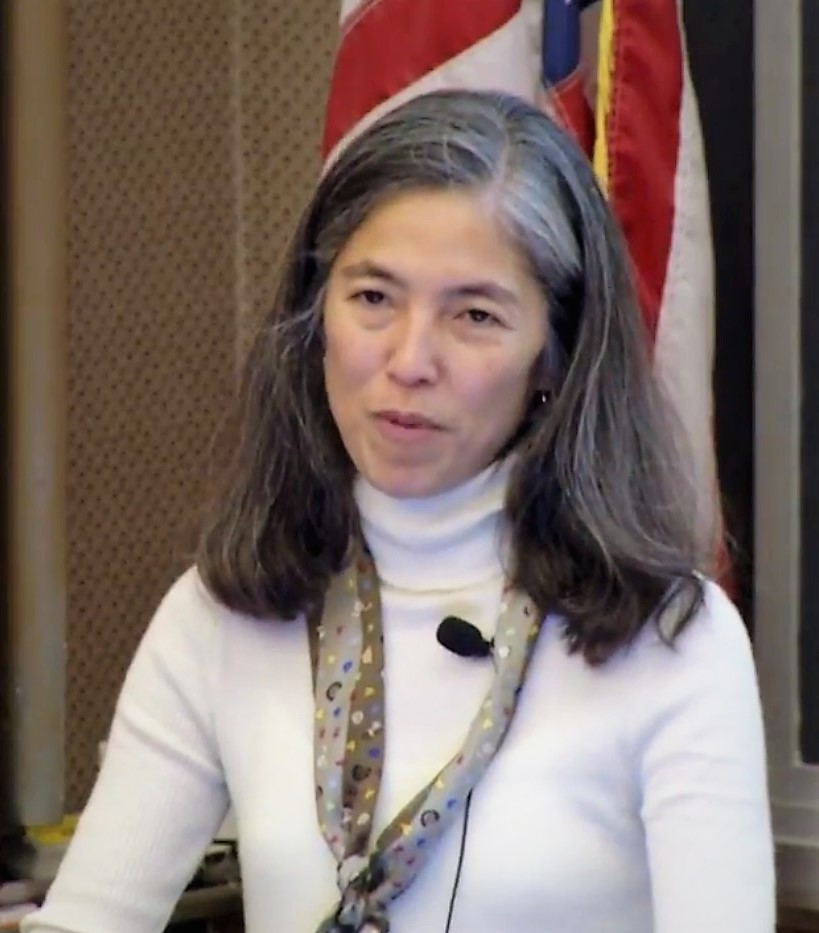
- Born: Chicago, Illinois, U.S.
- Education: University of Illinois, Urbana-Champaign (BS, MD)
- Awards: Member, National Academy of Medicine (2024)
- Scientific career
- Fields: Public health
- Institutions: Centers for Disease Control and Prevention (1997–1999); Chicago Department of Public Health (1999–2019); Robert Wood Johnson Foundation (2019–2024); Joyce Foundation (2024-present)

Julie Morita is an American public health expert. She is president of the Joyce Foundation and previously served as the executive vice president of the Robert Wood Johnson Foundation. She also served as a member of President Joe Biden's COVID-19 Advisory Board and as commissioner of the Chicago Department of Public Health.

== Early life and education ==
Morita was born in Chicago to Mototsugu and Betty Morita. During World War II, her parents were uprooted from their homes in the Pacific Northwest and detained in Japanese Internment Camps in Idaho. Morita has discussed her family's history as a major influence on her interest in health equity. As a young girl, she was interested in a career in medicine, inspired by the children's book "Nurse Nancy."

In 1982, she began her undergraduate career at the University of Illinois at Urbana–Champaign, where she planned to pursue a degree in engineering. Seeking a more human-to-human connection, she changed her major to biology to pursue the pre-medical track. In 1986, she received her Bachelor of Science degree. She then attended University of Illinois College of Medicine, where she received her Doctor of Medicine degree before performing her medical residency in pediatrics at the University of Minnesota from 1990 to 1993.

== Career ==
=== Early career ===
Following her residency, Morita practiced pediatrics in Tucson, Arizona, for four years before moving to Atlanta to join the Centers for Disease Control and Prevention as an Epidemic Intelligence Service Officer. There, she focused on vaccine-preventable diseases.

=== Role at Chicago Department of Public Health ===
In 1999, Morita returned to her home city of Chicago to join the Chicago Department of Public Health where she began working as the medical director for immunization. In this capacity, she oversaw the response to the 2009 swine flu pandemic, Ebola, and meningitis, as well as worked to address disparities in vaccination rates by focusing resources towards communities with lower vaccination rates. In 2014, after receiving an $800,000 grant provided through the Affordable Care Act, she worked to increase the number of HPV vaccinations among teenagers in Chicago, launching a campaign to broadcast public service announcements and leverage print and outdoor media to raise awareness. She also worked to decrease stigma around the HPV vaccine, which is another source of vaccine hesitancy.

In 2015, Morita was appointed as commissioner of the Chicago Department of Public Health under the leadership of Mayor Rahm Emanuel, becoming the first Asian American to lead the department. In this role, she developed and launched Healthy Chicago 2.0, a four-year program that launched in April 2016 focused on addressing health equity and addressing root causes of disparity, centering on community collaboration.

In June 2019, Morita left her post as commissioner to join the Robert Wood Johnson Foundation as executive vice president.

=== COVID-19 response ===
In her role at the Robert Wood Johnson Foundation, Morita worked to address the Coronavirus disease 2019 (COVID-19) pandemic in the United States, with a particular focus on the pandemic's effects in exacerbating existing inequities. She raised awareness around the economic effects of the pandemic, which have disproportionately impacted black and Latino communities in the United States. She and her colleagues used insights garnered from the survey to inform policies to address these economic inequities and address structural barriers. Morita advocated for the importance of coordinating with the Centers for Disease Control and Prevention to ensure rapid, safe, and equitable distribution of an eventual COVID-19 vaccine.

On November 9, 2020, Morita was named to serve on President Joe Biden's COVID-19 advisory board.
