= Colonel John Ashley House =

Historic house in Massachusetts, United States

- Col. John Ashley House
- U.S. National Register of Historic Places
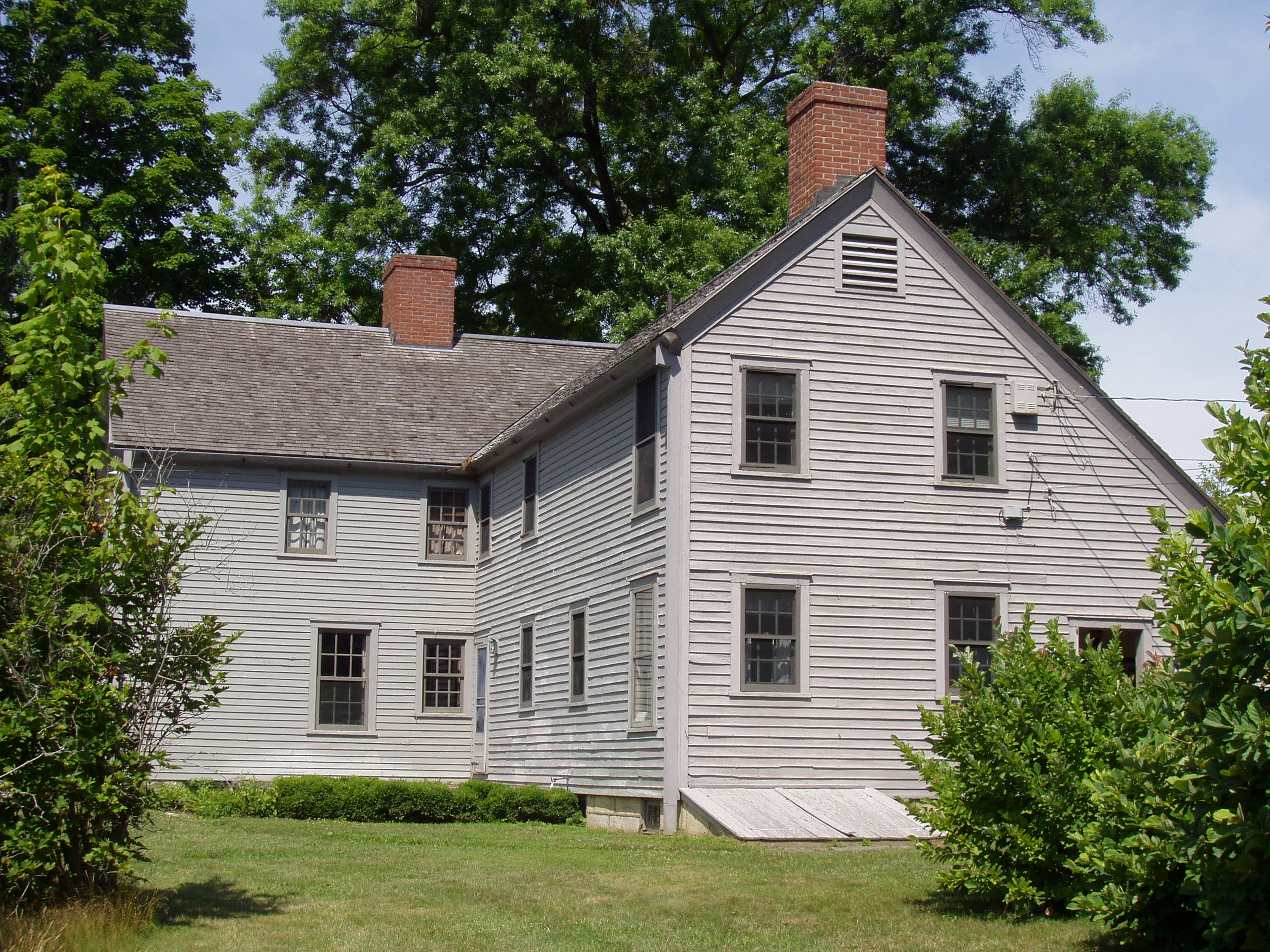

- Location within Massachusetts Location within the United States
- Location: 117 Cooper Hill Rd., Sheffield, Massachusetts
- Coordinates: 42°3′34″N 73°21′23″W
- Area: 4.9 acres (2.0 ha) (original size); 35 acres (14 ha) (after boundary increase)
- Built: 1735
- NRHP reference No.: 75001915 (original); 75002172 (increase)

Significant dates
- Added to NRHP: February 10, 1975
- Boundary increase: August 11, 1975

The Colonel John Ashley House is a historic house museum at 117 Cooper Hill Road in Sheffield, Massachusetts. Built in 1735 by a prominent local enslaver, it is one of the oldest houses in southern Berkshire County. The museum is owned and operated by The Trustees of Reservations, and is listed on the National Register of Historic Places.

== Description ==
The Ashley House stands in a rural area of central southern Sheffield, on the south side of Cooper Hill Road, west of the village of Ashley Falls. The house stands on 35 acres (14 ha) historically associated with it but is not on its original site, having been moved 3/10 of a mile in 1930 to improve its siting relative to the road and related outbuildings. The property is adjacent to Bartholomew's Cobble, a nature preserve also owned by The Trustees of Reservations.

The house is a 2 1/2-story wood-frame structure with a side-gable roof and central chimney. A 2 1/2-story cross-gabled ell extends to the rear, with a chimney. The exterior is finished with wooden clapboards. The main facade is five bays wide, with an elaborate central doorway surround. Pilasters rise to a wide entablature capped by a broken pediment.

The house is typical of early 18th-century rural American architecture, with furnishings and items dating from the 18th and early 19th centuries. It is open for tours on weekends from Memorial Day through Columbus Day.

== History ==
The house was built in 1735 by John Ashley (1709-1802), who moved to the area from Westfield. The house timbers were sawn using the first sawmill known to have been built in Berkshire County. Ashley was a leading citizen of the area, heading the local militia during the French and Indian War. In 1773, the Sheffield Declaration, a petition against British policies and manifesto for individual rights, was drafted in the upstairs study of the house.

By the American Revolutionary War, Ashley was too old to participate militarily, but he was instrumental in developing the iron industry in nearby Salisbury, Connecticut for the war effort.

In 1781, Elizabeth "Mum Bett" Freeman, a woman enslaved by the Ashley household, won her freedom under the new state constitution through a celebrated 1781 state court battle that marked the end of slavery in the state.

== Gallery ==
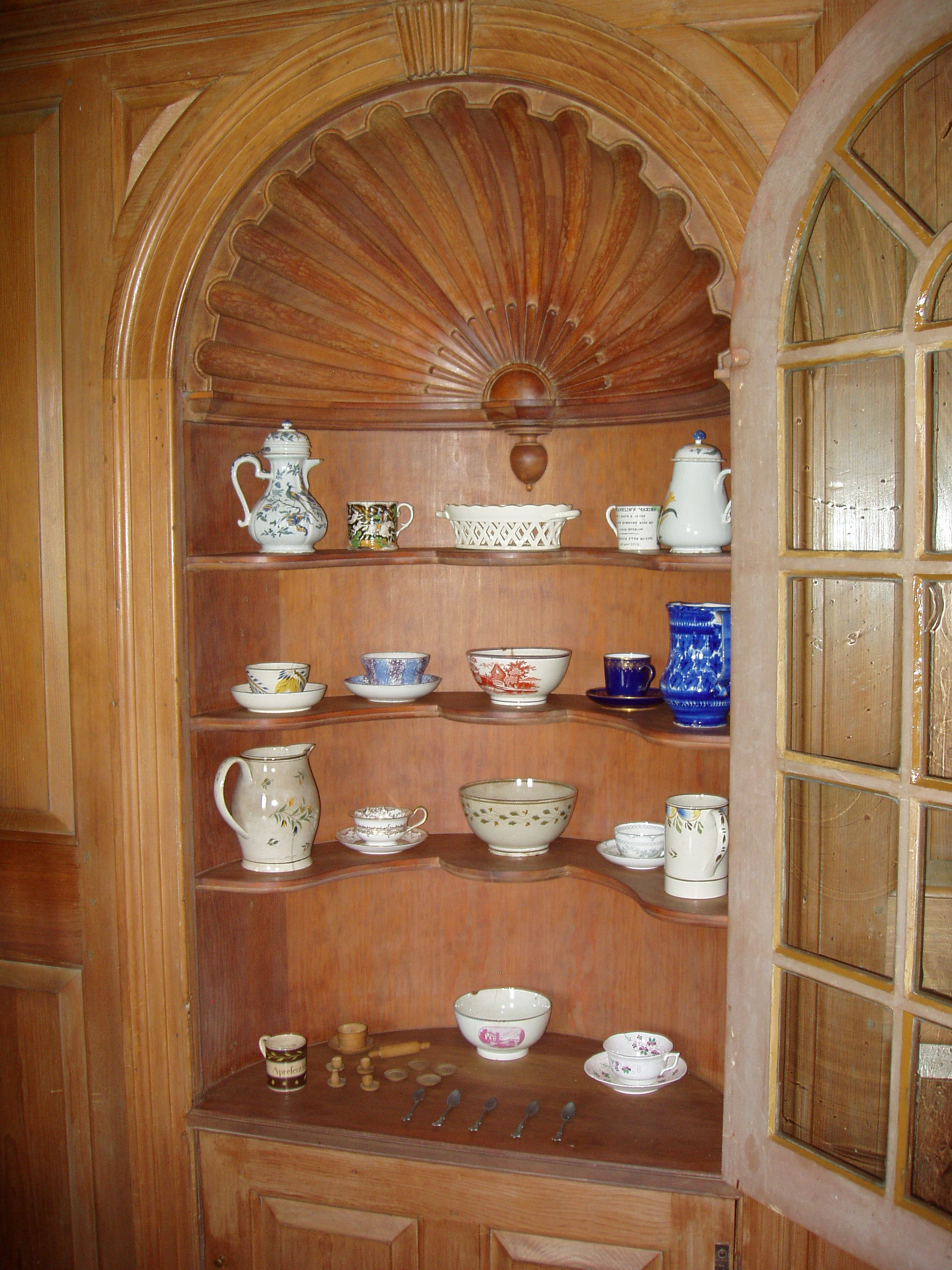
Interior detail

== See also ==
- National Register of Historic Places listings in Berkshire County, Massachusetts
