= David Joyce (businessman) =

American lumber baron (1825–1904)

- Portrait of David Joyce
- Born: 26 February 1825; Sheffield, Massachusetts
- Died: 4 December 1904 (aged 79); Minneapolis, Minnesota
- Occupations: Industrialist, lumber baron
- Spouse: Elizabeth F. Thomas
- Children: William Thomas Joyce
- Parent(s): John Dibble Joyce & Jerusha Jones

David Joyce (26 February 1825 – 4 December 1904) was an American "lumber baron" and industrialist. His fortune was eventually inherited by Beatrice Joyce Kean who used it to establish the Joyce Foundation in 1948.

== Early life ==
David Joyce was born at Mt. Washington in the town of Sheffield, Massachusetts on February 26, 1825. His father John D. Joyce operated a blast furnace machine shop and foundry in Berkshire county (moved to Salisbury, Connecticut in 1844). John Joyce gave his son such moderate education as was afforded by the common school, until, at the age of twelve years, David Joyce was hired as the driver of one of his father’s teams. Desirous of learning and of aspiring disposition, he developed a taste for mathematics and for mechanic arts. By working for his father, he not only acquired a knowledge of machinery and the foundry business, but also became a practical civil engineer and surveyor, making the instruments of this profession with his own hands. He continued to work for his father until 1848, when, at the age of thirty years, he started his own mercantile business, assuming full control of two general stores.

== Business in Clinton, Iowa (Lyons) ==
Joyce left his home in Sheffield, Massachusetts, in 1854 to see the developing frontier country that then was Iowa. He spent two years in Lyons, Iowa, engaged in the livestock and agricultural product business, before returning to his general stores in Massachusetts. He enlarged his business in 1857 by purchasing that of his father, John D. Joyce, in what was known as Joyceville in the town of Salisbury. He united the businesses and continued their operation until 1860 when he disposed of his interests and moved back west. David Joyce came to Lyons, Iowa in 1861 and leased the Stumbaugh mill, purchasing his log stock in the raft and disposing of his lumber in a retail yard. In 1869 he went into partnership with S.I. Smith, and "Joyce & Smith" erected a sawmill on Ringwood slough, with a capacity of 50,000 board feet (100 m^{3}) of lumber and twenty-five thousand shingles daily. In 1873, Joyce purchased the interest of his partner and became sole owner. As his operations increased, he became one of the most influential lumbermen of the Mississippi valley, becoming interested in the manufacture of lumber at several other points. In July, 1888, his mill was burned, only to be rebuilt by the opening of the next season. The new mill had a capacity of 100,000 board feet (200 m^{3}) of lumber, forty thousand shingles and twenty thousand laths per day. Joyce operated this mill until his death in 1895, after which his son, W.T. Joyce, carried on the business, which continued to run as the last of the big mills of Clinton, Iowa.

== Other business interests ==
The lumber and other interests of David Joyce spanned almost the length and breadth of the Mississippi Valley. He at one time was president of the First National bank of Lyons and served four years as mayor of that city. When he became mayor, the bonds of the city were selling at forty-five cents on the dollar, when he left the office the treasury was in position to pay one hundred cents on the dollar for every claim which existed against it.

Joyce was also president of the Trinity County Lumber Co. (Groveton, Texas); Langford & Hall Lumber Co. (Fulton, Illinois); Benjamin Machine Co., (Chicago); Crescent Springs Railroad Company; (Shell Lake, Wisconsin)., and Shell Lake Lumber Co. (Shell Lake, Wisconsin). In addition, he was one of the biggest stockholders in the White River Lumber Co. (Mason, Wisconsin); Park Hotel (Hot Springs, Arkansas); and the Mississippi River Logging Company. He also held stock in a number of Chicago banks, and owned large tracts of timber land in Wisconsin and Texas.

Finally, Joyce was instrumental in securing the construction of the first street railroad between Lyons and Clinton, which railroad was under his general management until the fall of 1891.
