= Bartholomew's Cobble =

National Natural Landmark in Massachusetts

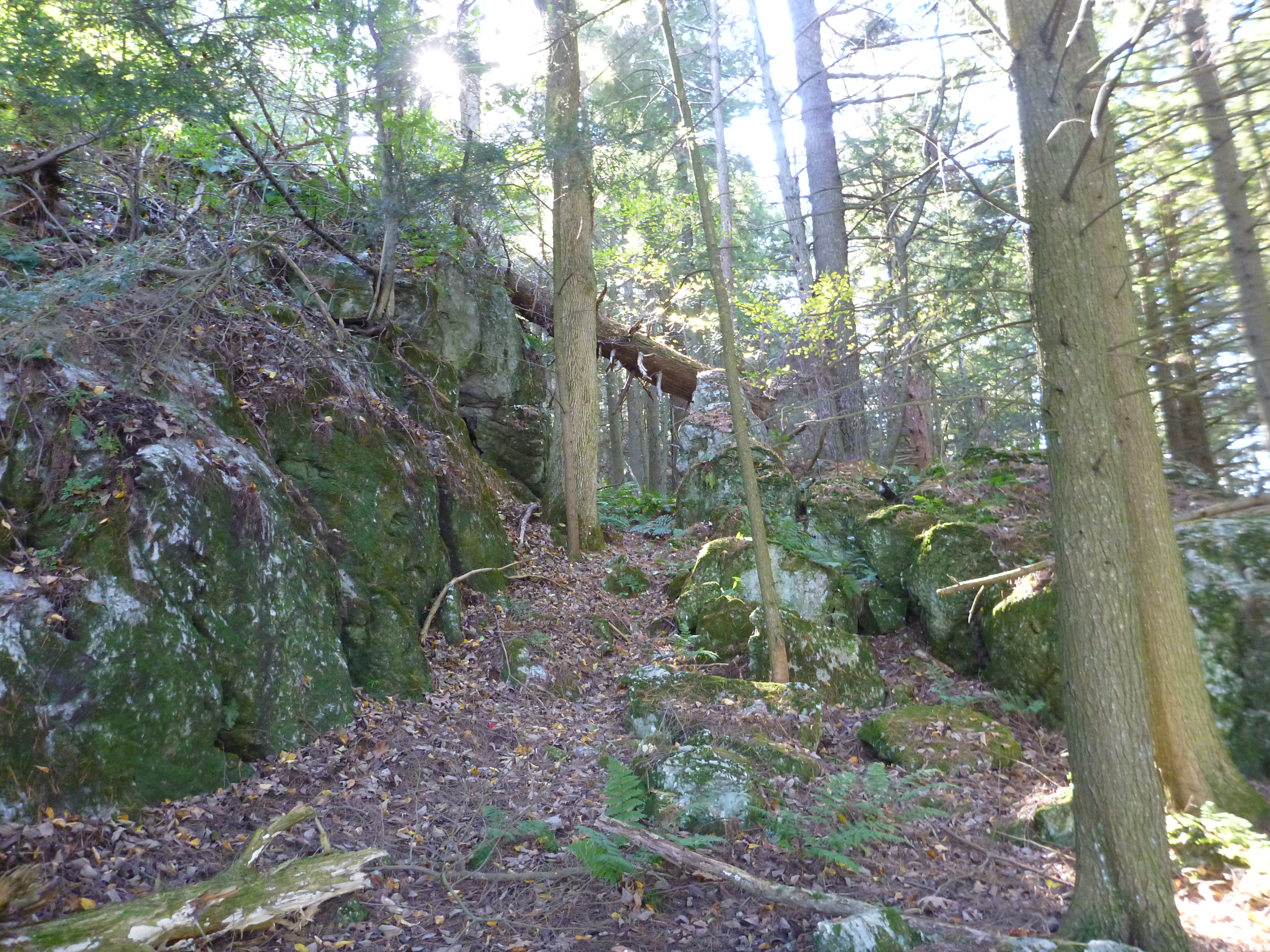

- Location within Massachusetts Location within the United States
- Location: Massachusetts, United States
- Coordinates: 42°3′26″N 73°21′3″W
- Established: 1946
- Operator: The Trustees of Reservations
- Website: Bartholomew's Cobble

Bartholomew's Cobble is a 329-acre (1.33 km^{2}) National Natural Landmark, open space preserve, agricultural preserve, and bio-reserve located in southwest Massachusetts in the village of Ashley Falls abutting Canaan, Connecticut. The preserve contains more than 800 plant species, including North America's greatest diversity of ferns and the greatest overall biodiversity in Berkshire County, Massachusetts; it also contains Massachusetts' highest populations of ground nesting bobolinks. It was declared a National Natural Landmark in October 1971.

The preserve includes two rocky knolls for which the property is named (the Cobbles), as well as floodplain along the Konkapot and Housatonic Rivers, working hayfields and pastures, meadows, and 1,000-foot (300 m) Hurlburt's Hill, an open hilltop with a panoramic view of The Berkshires, the Taconic Mountains, and the Housatonic River Valley. The property has been owned and managed by the non-profit conservation organization The Trustees of Reservations since 1946. Hiking trails and an interpretive center and museum are located on the preserve. Rangers and staff lead guided canoe trips on the Housatonic River in season.

== History ==
Cobble is derived from the German word kobel or koble, usually applied to small, rocky, rounded and exposed hill.

The property was originally occupied by the Mahican tribe and subsequently settled by Colonel John Ashley, a New England colonial revolutionary for whom Ashely Falls is named. Ashley built a house near the Cobbles—the Colonel John Ashley House—now a historic site also managed by The Trustees of Reservations.

The name comes from a series of Bartholomews that owned the property after Colonel Ashley. In 1838 Wyllis Bartholomew purchased the Colonel John Ashley house and five and one quarter acres from the Ashley family; it is said he used it for farm laborer housing. He owned it until his death in 1846 when Wyllis' son Hiram inherited it. In 1852, Hiram sold it to his son George, who farmed it for many years. It only became known as Bartholomew's Cobble when George owned it."

The property was farmland and pasture before it came into the hands of The Trustees of the Reservations in 1946. Additional acreage was acquired through more than ten purchases and donations from 1963 to 2000.

== Biodiversity ==
Several factors contribute to the biodiversity of Bartholomew's Cobble. First, the region is spacially and climatically located such that it contains a number of species that reach the northern or southern limit of their range in North America. Second, the property is located at the boundary of two distinct state bioregions: the marble valley lowlands of the Berkshires geology and the Taconic uplands. Third, the Cobbles, twin rocky knolls abutting the Housatonic River, are composed of quartzite, an acidic rock, and marble, an alkaline (calcareous) rock. This produces high variation in soil chemistry, which in turn supports species of ferns and other plants that do not normally grow in close proximity to one another. Fern species include the walking fern, maidenhair spleenwort, mountain spleenwort, maidenhair fern, bulblet fern, marginal woodfern, polypody, ostrich fern, and evergreen woodfern. Flowering plant species include red columbine, herb Robert, northern prickly ash, bloodroot, spring beauty, bergamot, mayapple, and round-lobed hepatica.

West of the Cobbles, the landscape changes to open managed hay fields dotted with eastern red cedar and then to upland forests of red oak, eastern hemlock, yellow birch, shagbark hickory, sugar maple, and black birch. Rare upland species include the great blue lobelia. Hay fields are managed to preserve habitat for ground nesting bobolinks.

Along the Housatonic and Konkapot River floodplain are located a number of oxbow lakes, wetlands, open pastures, and riverine forests. Species include the great blue heron, bobcat, northern pike, New England cottontail, bald eagle, eastern cottonwood, American sycamore, black willow, and stinging nettle.

Bartholomew's Cobble is an important migratory bird habitat. More than 250 species of birds have been documented on the property, including the bank swallow, bobolink, bald eagle, red-tailed hawk, great blue heron, great egret, wood duck, and pileated woodpecker.

== Recreation and education ==
Bartholemew's Cobble, located on Weatogue Road in Ashley Falls, is open during daylight hours. In order to protect the delicate ecology of the area, no pets are allowed on the property.

More than 5 miles (8.0 km) of moderately difficult hiking trails are located on the preserve, including The Ledges Trail, a self-guided interpretive walk that runs over and around the Cobbles. The visitor center and museum include displays of natural and human history, photography, art, and taxidermic displays of local animals, birds, and bird eggs. The Trustees of Reservations offers guided natural history tours led by naturalists with proceeds supporting conservation work at Bartholomew's Cobble including wildlife research, invasive species control, protecting endangered species, and restoring native habitats.

== Gallery ==
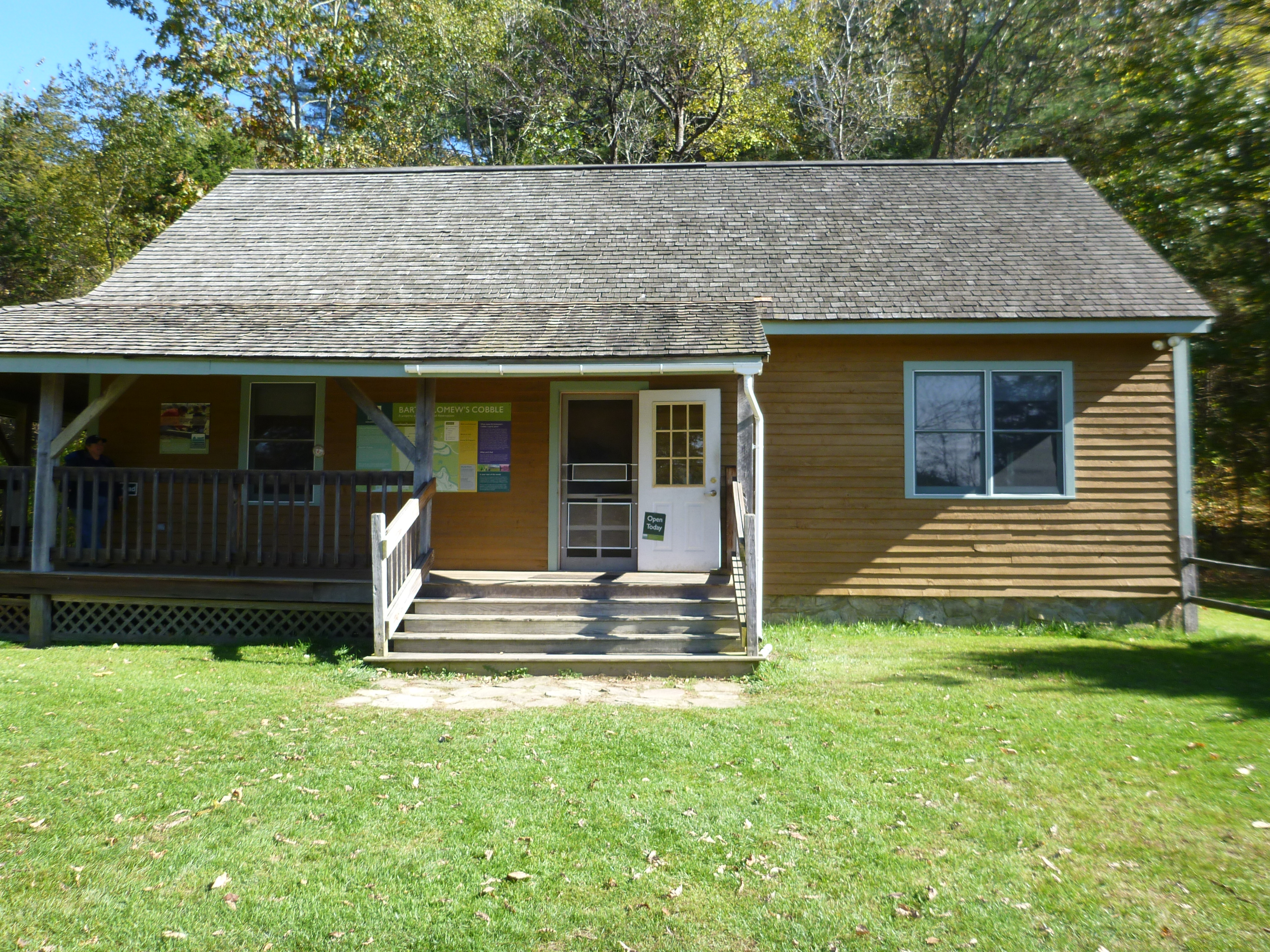
Visitor Center

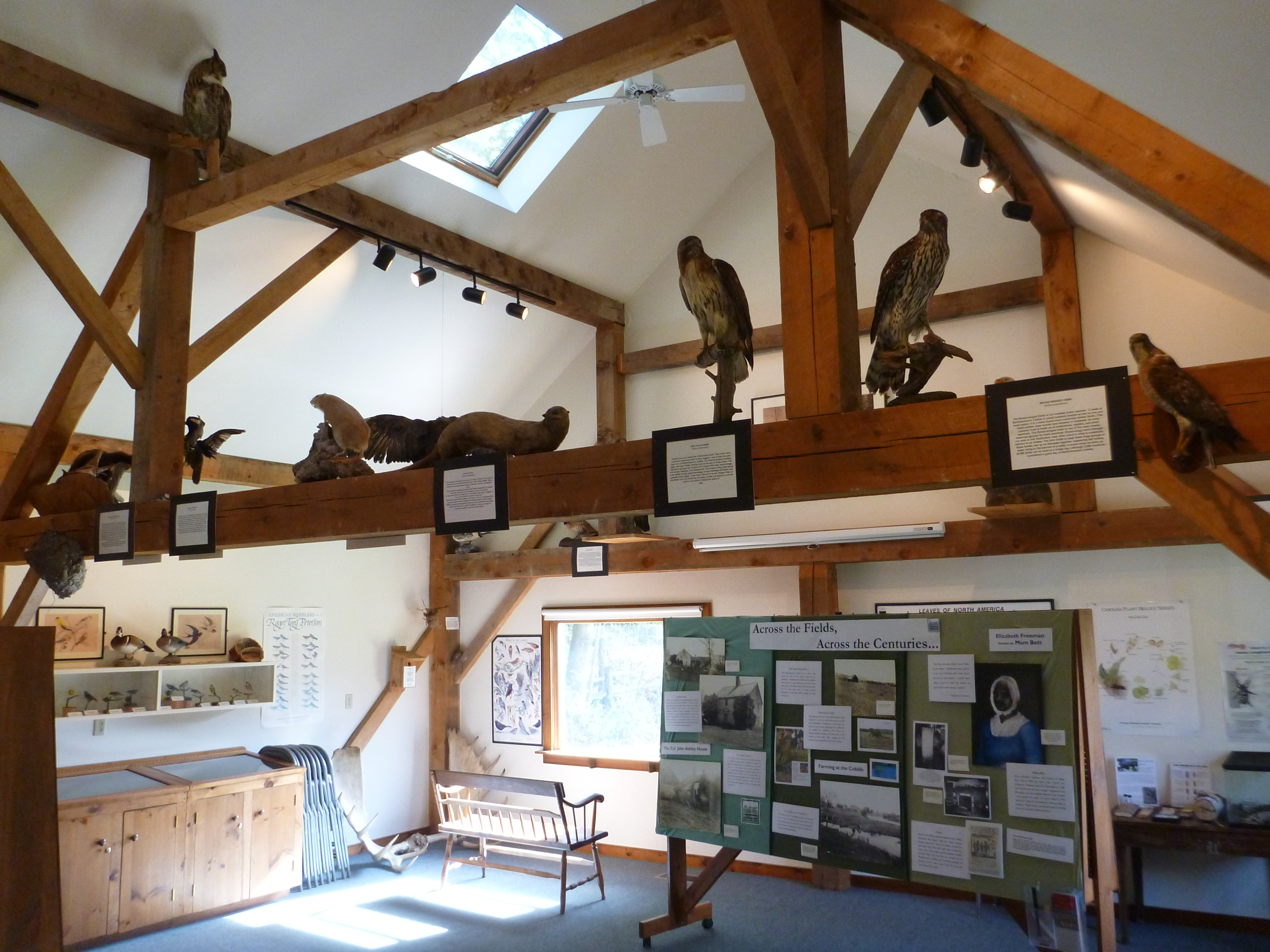
Visitor Center interior

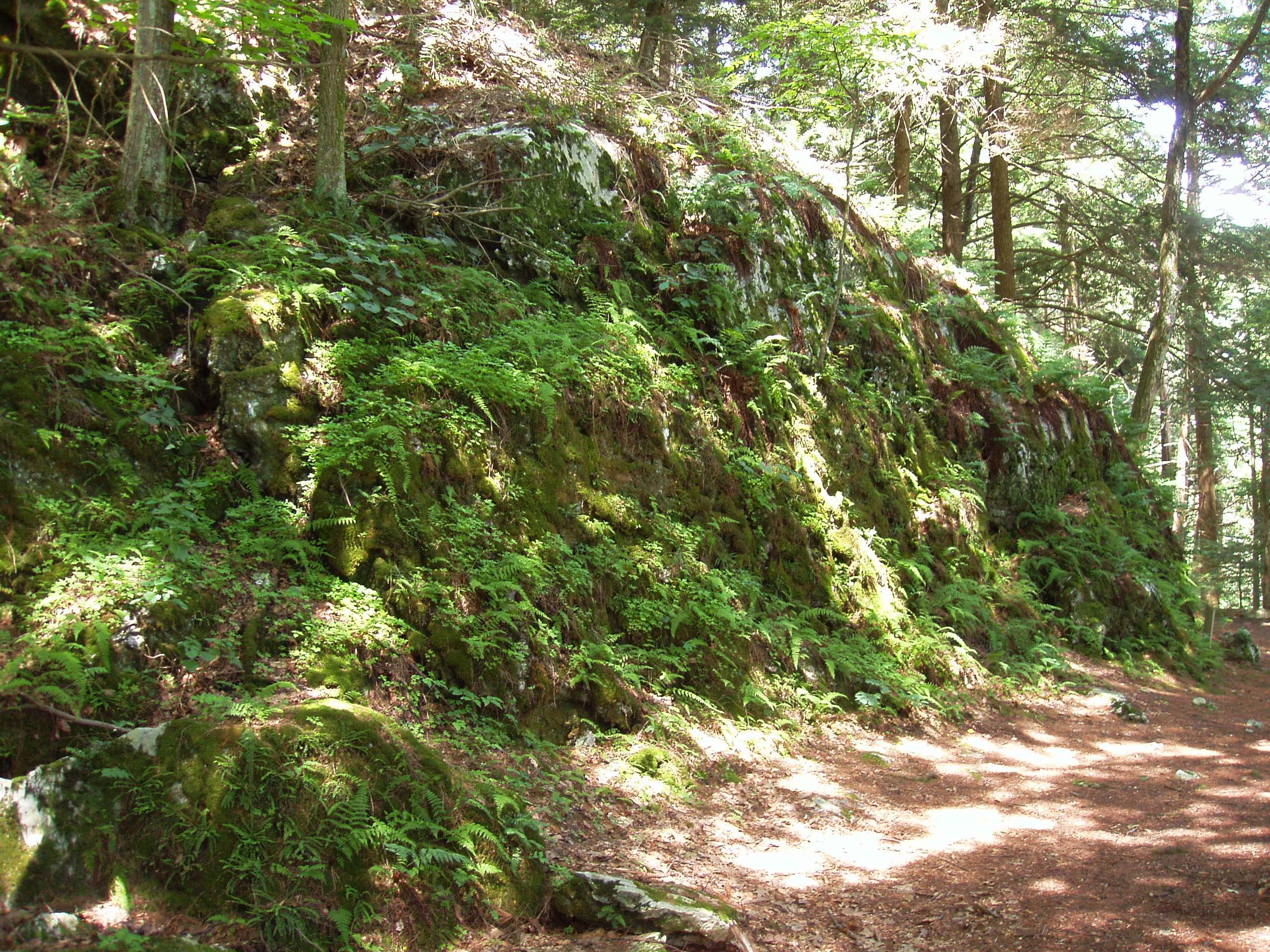
Cobble trail

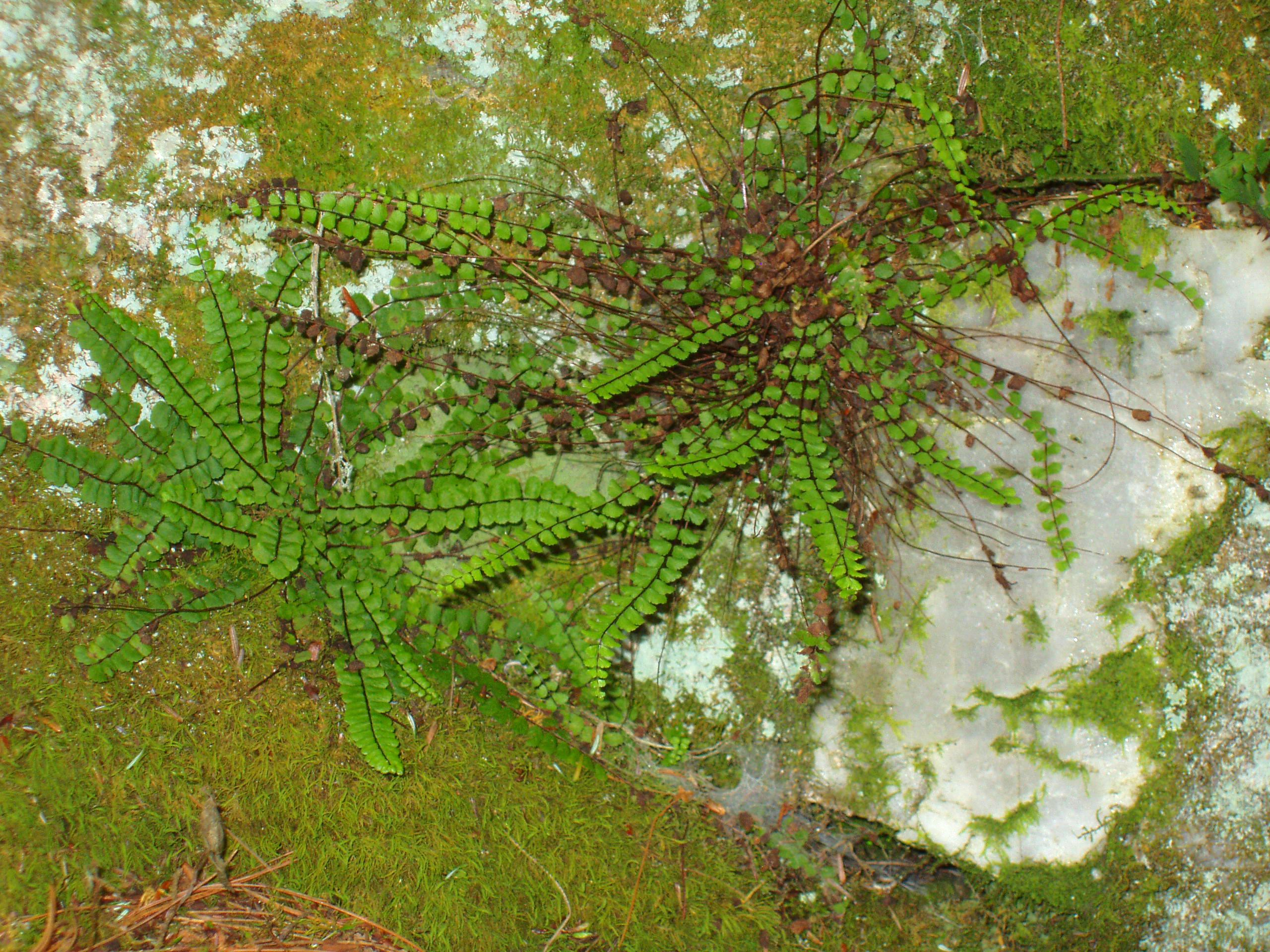
Maidenhair spleenwort and moss growing on Cobble ledge

== See also ==
- Colonel John Ashley House
