= Sheffield Declaration =

Colonial American petition against British policies

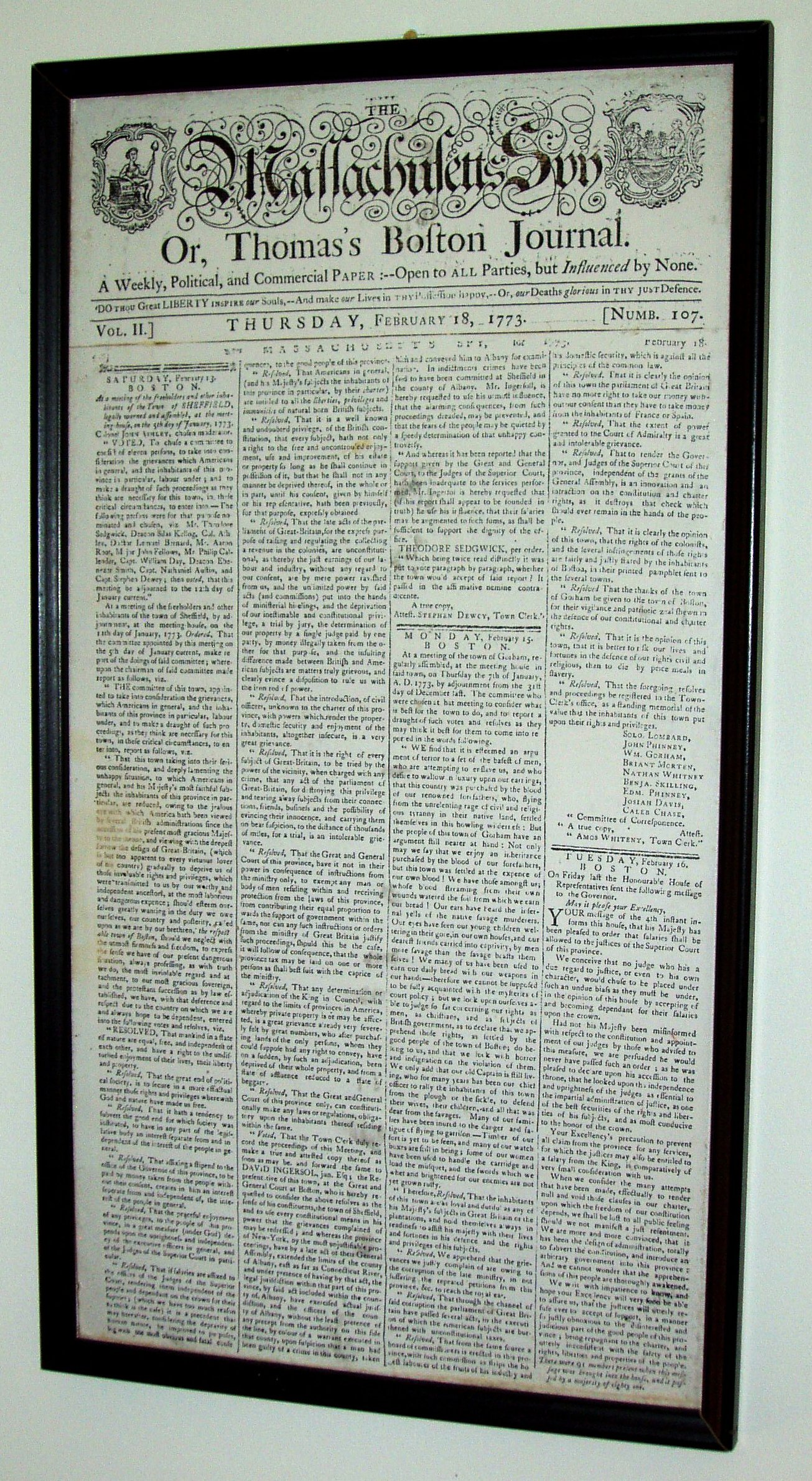
Sheffield Declaration, as printed in The Massachusetts Spy

The Sheffield Declaration, also known as the Sheffield Resolves, was a Colonial American petition against British policies and manifesto for individual rights, drawn up as a series of resolves approved by the Town of Sheffield, Massachusetts, on January 12, 1773 and printed in The Massachusetts Spy, Or, Thomas's Boston Journal on February 18, 1773. The meeting took place in the Colonel John Ashley House, a property listed in the National Register of Historic Places in Ashley Falls, a village of Sheffield, Massachusetts.

The resolves were debated and approved by a committee of eleven local citizens: Deacon Silas Kellogg, Col. John Ashley (committee moderator), Dr. Lemuel Bernard, Aaron Root, Major John Fellows, Philip Callender, Capt. William Day, Deacon Ebenezer Smith, Capt. Nathaniel Austin, Capt. Stephen Dewey, and Theodore Sedgwick, who wrote the text.

The Declaration's first resolution was that "Mankind in a state of nature are equal, free, and independent of each other, and have a right to the undisturbed enjoyment of their lives, their liberty and property," These words are echoed in the most famous line of Thomas Jefferson's Declaration of Independence three years later: "We hold these truths to be self-evident, that all men are created equal, that they are endowed by their Creator with certain unalienable Rights, that among these are Life, Liberty and the pursuit of Happiness."
