= Paula DiPerna =

- Occupations: Author, speaker
- Known for: President of the Joyce Foundation, Vice President at Chicago Climate Exchange, President of CCX International

Paula DiPerna is a writer and frequent media and conference speaker on a variety of subjects. She has served as President of the Joyce Foundation, as well as vice president for Recruitment and Public Policy at the Chicago Climate Exchange, which pioneered emissions trading and environmental markets worldwide, as well as President of CCX International. Prior to these positions, she served as writer and Vice President for International Affairs for the Cousteau Society, whose President was explorer and filmmaker, Jacques-Yves Cousteau.

While at the Cousteau Society, DiPerna wrote and co-produced numerous documentary films and traveled extensively around the world with the famous vessel "Calypso" and its expedition teams, including throughout the Amazon regions of South America. DiPerna is currently a columnist for Women Advisors Forum and Forbes.com, as well as Special Advisor to the Carbon Disclosure Project, which administers an annual questionnaire on behalf of major investors and asset managers to businesses and corporations regarding their environmental risk.

In addition to her environmental career, DiPerna is a prolific writer, and has been published in a number of major newspapers and magazines. Her book, "Cluster Mystery: Epidemic and the Children of Woburn, Mass." was the first book to be written about an infamous leukemia cluster possibly associated with contaminated drinking water. DiPerna has written other non-fiction books, including "Oakhurst: The Birth and Rebirth of America's First Golf Course" (2002). Her novel, "The Discoveries of Mrs. Christopher Columbus: His Wife's Version" (1994) is a fictional journal that might have been kept by the wife of Columbus.

DiPerna has also served as a consultant to numerous national and international organizations, such as the World Bank and LEAD-International, and was awarded an Eisenhower Fellowship. A lifelong New Yorker, Ms. DiPerna graduated from New York University with B.A. and M.A. degrees and was a candidate for the U.S. Congress in 1992.

== List of works ==
=== Books ===
- Oakhurst: The Birth and Rebirth of America’s First Golf Course, (Walker and Company, 2002)
- His Wife’s Version: The Discoveries of Mrs. Christopher Columbus, (Permanent Press, Fall 1994)
- With These Hands, (Pilgrim Press, Fall, 1986)
- Cluster Mystery: Epidemic and the Children of Woburn, Mass, (C.V. Mosby Company, Fall, 1985)
- Juries on Trial: Faces of American Justice, (Dembner Books/W.W. Norton, Fall 1984)
- The Cousteau Almanac, (Doubleday, Fall, 1981) (Contributing Editor and Principal Writer)
- The Complete Travel Guide to Cuba, (St. Martin's Press, Winter 1979)

=== Other ===
- She contributed the piece "Update: Feminism and the Environment" to the 2003 anthology Sisterhood Is Forever: The Women's Anthology for a New Millennium, edited by Robin Morgan.

== Filmography ==
- Co-director and Writer, Kuwait: War and Environment; Green Cross International
- Writer, Palawan: The Last Refuge
- Co-Producer and Writer, Nauru: The Island Planet
- Co-Producer and Writer, Outrage at Valdez
- Writer, Western Australia: Out West, Down Under
- Writers, Tasmania: Awakening Island and Fortunes in the Sea
- Writer, Lilliput in Antarctica
- Writer, Australia: The Last Barrier
- Writer and Associate Producer, New Zealand: The Land of the Long White Cloud
- Writer and Associate Producer, New Zealand: The Smoldering Sea
- Writer and Production Coordinator, Cuba: Waters of Destiny
