= Hampden Railroad =

Railway line in Massachusetts, US

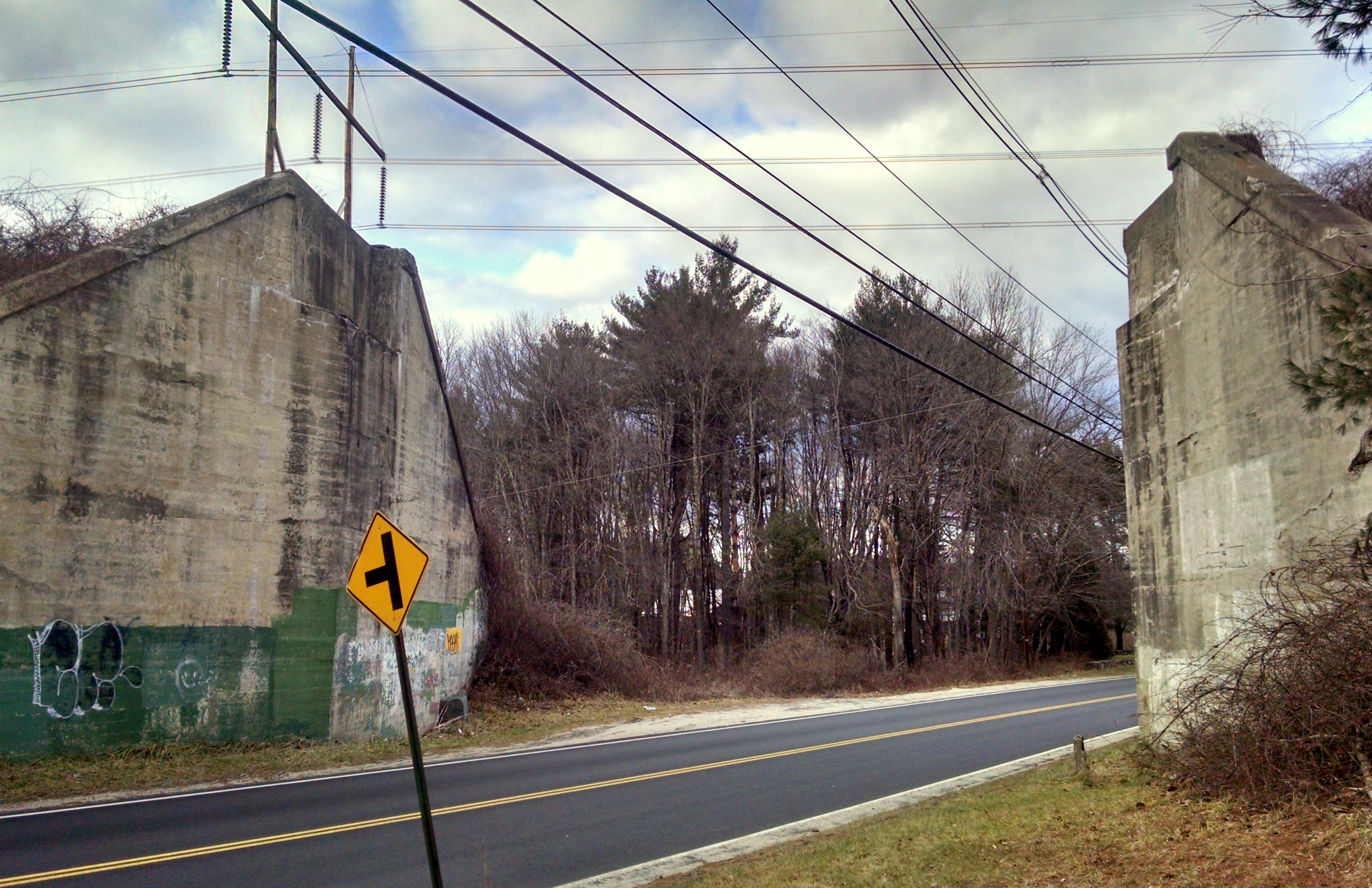
Abutments of a former Hampden Railroad bridge in Bondsville, Massachusetts

The Hampden Railroad (1910−1925) was an unused railroad built in central Massachusetts on behalf of the Boston and Maine Railroad (B&M) and New York, New Haven and Hartford Railroad (NYNH&H) and intended to be leased to the former.

== History ==
=== Purpose ===
The object of the Hampden railroad was to connect the Central Massachusetts Railroad (CMR), a line leased to the B&M, with the NYNH&H at Springfield and thus make a through route from that city to the North Station of the B&M in Boston. This would be in competition with the existing route of the Boston and Albany Railroad (B&A) between Springfield and Boston.

=== Proposal ===
The route of the railroad, as prescribed by its charter in 1910, consisted of a main line about 12 miles (19 km) long, starting near Bondsville, where a junction was to be made with the CMR, heading west-southwest through Belchertown and Ludlow to a junction in Chicopee. From there, one line would run about 4 miles (6.4 km) to connect with the Chicopee Falls branch of the B&M, and another line would about 2.5 miles (4.0 km) to Athol Junction in Springfield, connecting with the main line tracks of the B&A, with which arrangements were made so that interchange of traffic could be made with the New Haven-Springfield Line of the NYNH&H and the passenger station at Springfield be used.

=== Construction ===
Because of financial problems suffered by the B&M, it was decided to have the line built by an independently financed company which would be leased to the B&M on completion. The proposal was facilitated by Charles Sanger Mellen, who was then president of the NYNH&H at the time and also served on the executive board of the B&M. He signed an agreement in September 1911 to lease the railroad in his latter capacity, and this was ratified by the Hampden shareholders in October. Construction began immediately.

The project was financed by $1 400 000 share capital, and $1 900 000 in money market bonds -a total of $3 300 000.

By 1912, 90% of the grading of the main line had been finished and 5 miles (8.0 km) of track had been laid. By June 23, 1913, the line was practically completed, except for the junction connection with the CMR at Bondsville. The Chicopee Falls branch was not begun.

=== Failure ===
However, the proposed lease of the line to the B&M was not approved by the Public Service Commission of Massachusetts, which found that over $4 000 000 had been spent on the project. The approval of the PSC was essential to the legality of the lease, and as a result the B&M did not proceed. By this time, Mellen was no longer on the board.

This rendered the railroad useless, so it was never opened and no revenue train ever used it.

In 1919, the Hampden company sued the B&M for breach of contract in not honouring the proposed lease. This legal action failed, since the validity of the lease depended on PSC approval.

In 1921, the bond issue fell due and the money owed, with interest, was more than $2,000,000. The Hampden company had no revenue or liquid funds, and so went into receivership. It was sold for scrap to the Roxbury Iron & Metals Company for $30,000. This meant that the bondholders got back 1.5 cents for each dollar, and the shareholders were wiped out.

== Route ==
The line was mostly very straight and well engineered. It ran north-east from Athol Junction at Springfield, before curving eastwards to parallel the Athol branch of the B&M to Three Rivers, and then to the (never connected) junction with the CMR south-east of the latter's Bondsville station. It crossed the CMR to make the junction on the latter's north side.

The maximum curvature was 4 degrees and the steepest grade was 1.23% which was over Minnechoag Mountain in Ludlow. In addition, there was not a single grade crossing. This required 28 bridges over the 15 mile route, in addition to several huge grade fills and cuts. The Minnechoag cut itself was 4,800 feet (1.5 km) long and 70 feet (21 metres) deep.

The longest bridge was the steel trestle at Bircham Bend over the Chicopee River, which was 85 feet (26 metres) above the river and was 1,098 feet (0.335 km) long. The bridge over the Swift River at Three Rivers was 400 feet (120 metres) long, ran 61 feet (19 metres) above the river and continued over the Central Vermont Railroad. There were four passenger stations: East Springfield, Ludlow, Three Rivers and Thorndike.

== Sources ==
- Johnson, Philip E. (2014). The Hampden Railroad - The Greatest Railroad that Never Ran. Lulu.com. ISBN 978-1304733900.
