= Niverville =

Niverville may refer to the following communities:

- Niverville, Manitoba, in Canada
- Niverville, New York, in the United States
  - Niverville (B&A station), a defunct railway station

== See also ==
- Joseph-Claude Boucher de Niverville (1715-1804), Canadian fur trader and explorer
- Louis-Charles Boucher de Niverville (1825-1869), Quebec lawyer and political figure
