= Boston and Albany Railroad =

American railroad line (1867-1961)

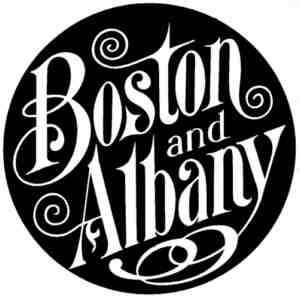

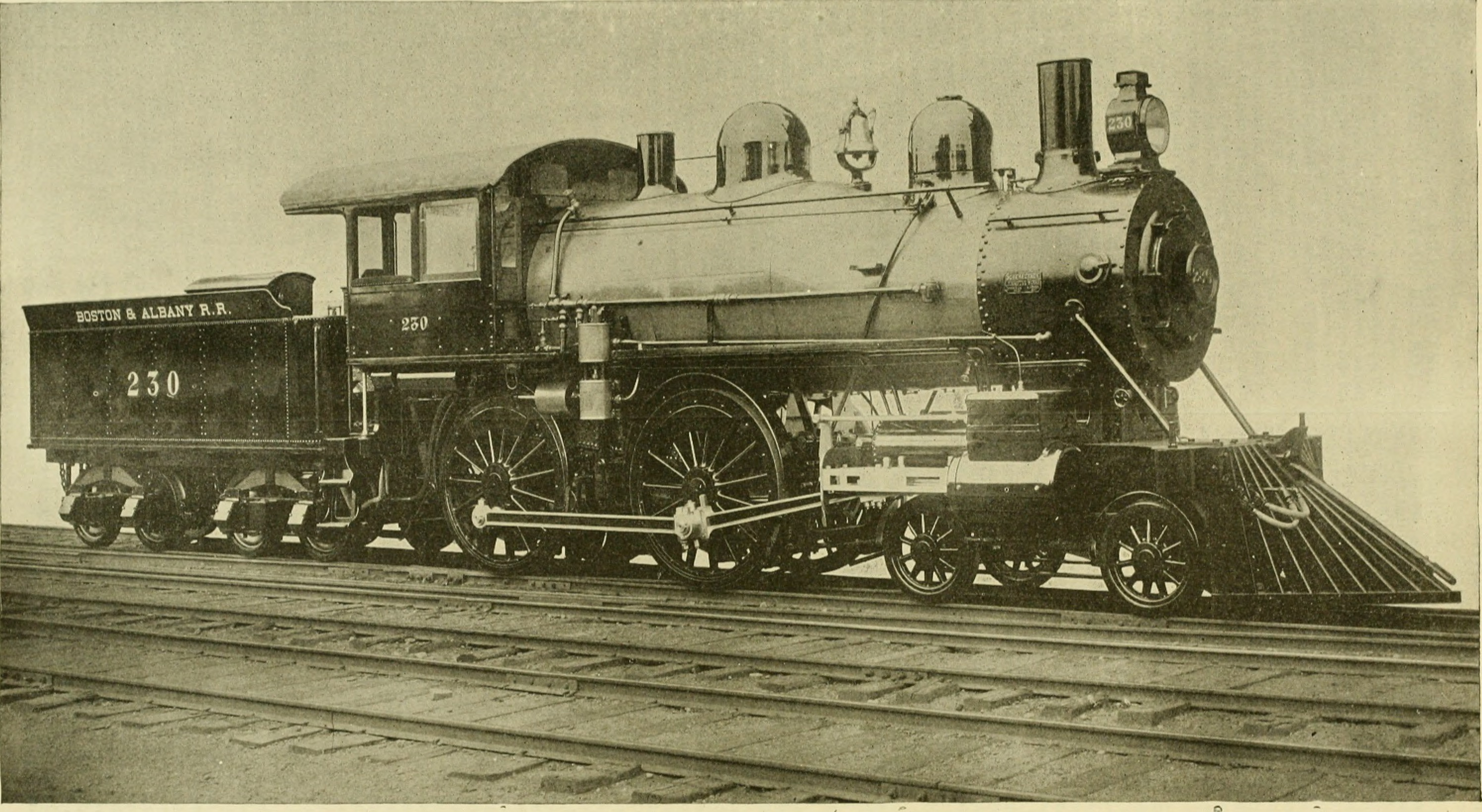
- A Boston and Albany Railroad locomotive in 1893

Overview
- Reporting mark: B&A
- Locale: Massachusetts and eastern New York
- Dates of operation: 1867–1961

Technical
- Track gauge: 4 ft 8 1/2 in (1,435 mm) standard gauge

The Boston and Albany Railroad (reporting mark B&A) was a railroad connecting Boston, Massachusetts, to Albany, New York, later becoming part of the New York Central Railroad system, Conrail, and CSX Transportation. The mainline is used by CSX for freight as the Berkshire Subdivision and Boston Subdivision. Norfolk Southern also has trackage rights to operate freight trains over the line. Passenger service is provided on the line by Amtrak, as part of their Lake Shore Limited service, and by the MBTA Commuter Rail system, which owns the section east of Worcester and operates it as its Framingham/Worcester Line.

== History ==
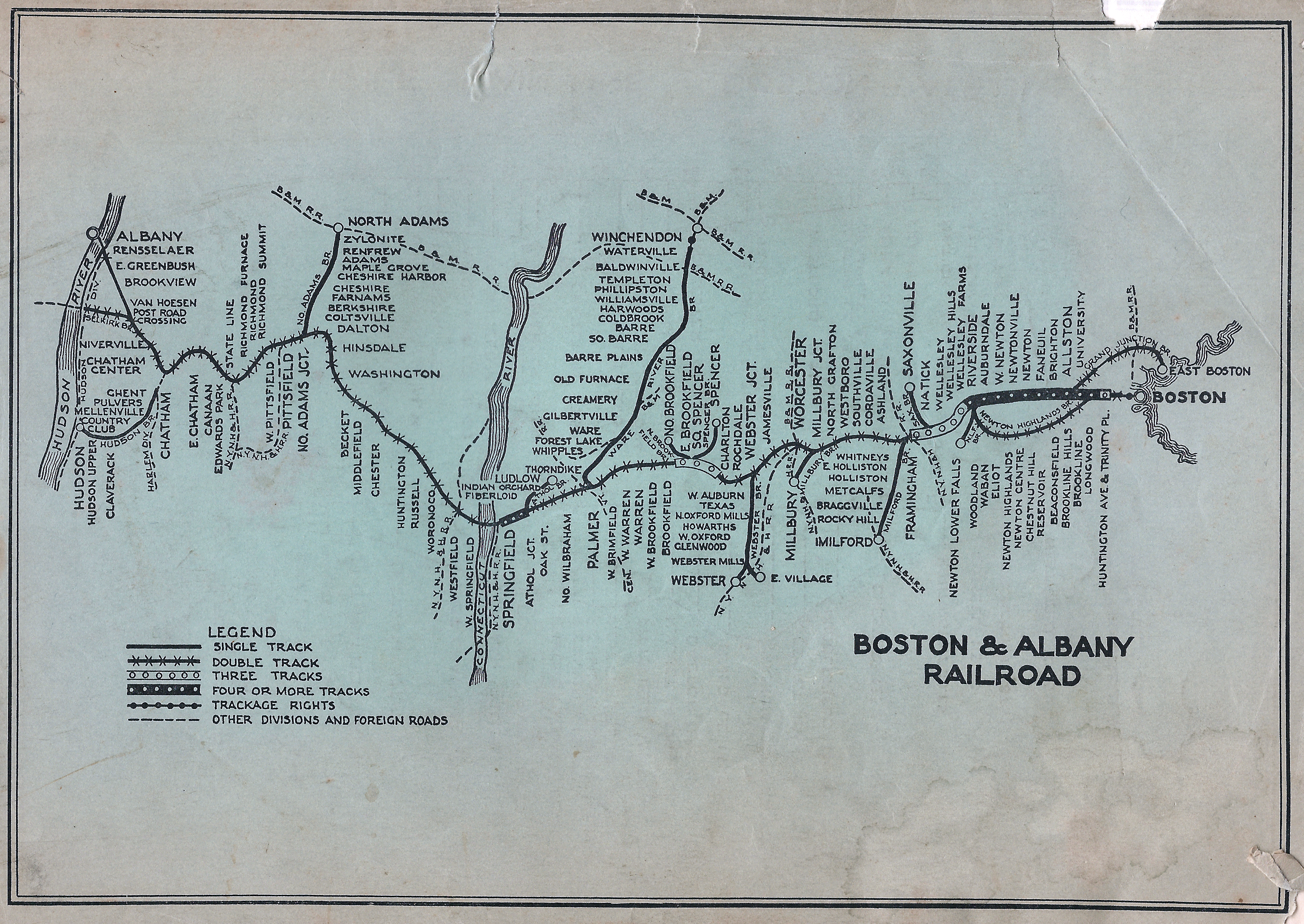
System Map of Boston & Albany RR (N.Y.C.R.R. Lessee) as of 1956-04-29, from Employee Timetable No. 176

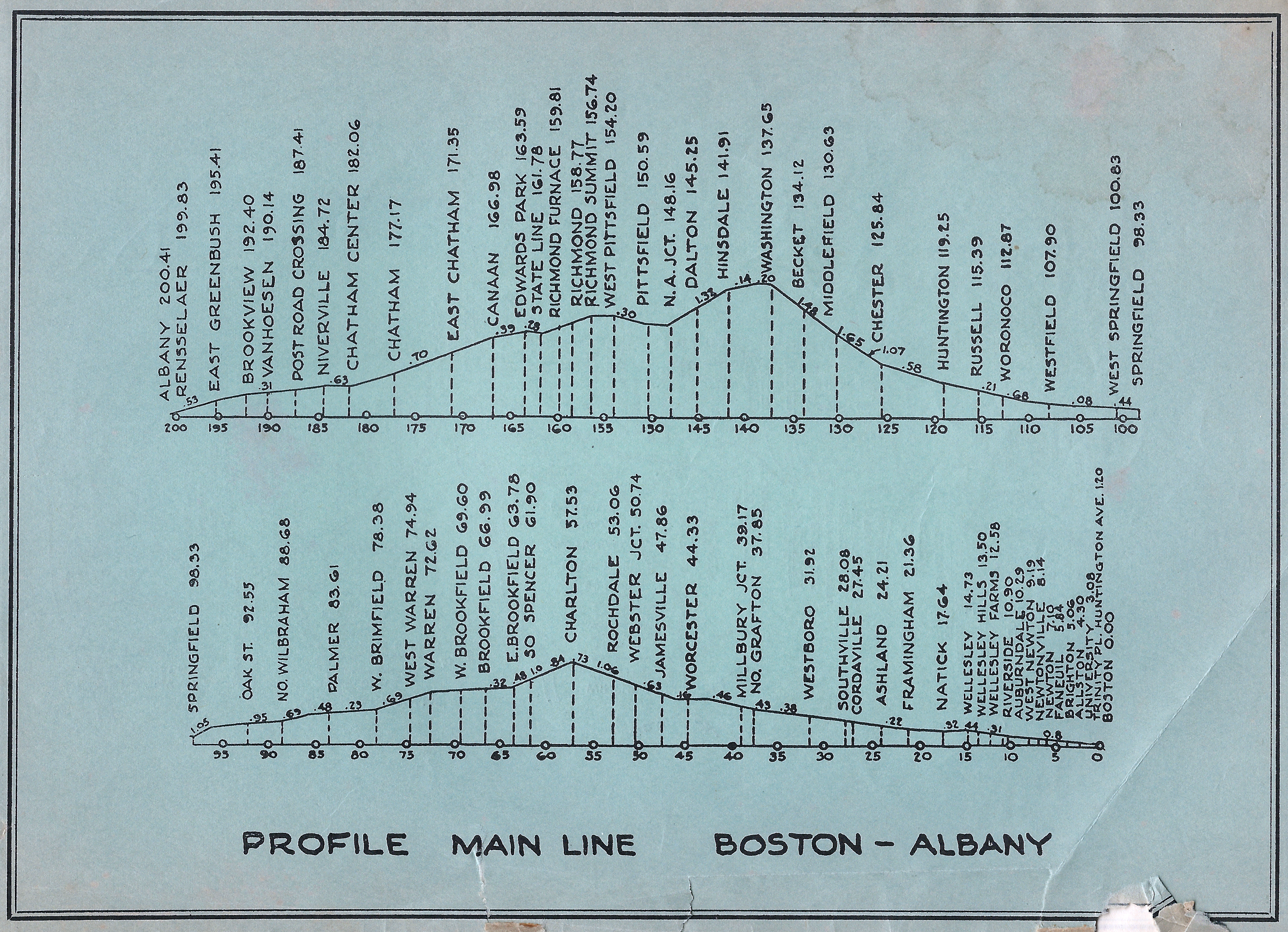
Gradient Profile of Main Line Boston-Albany

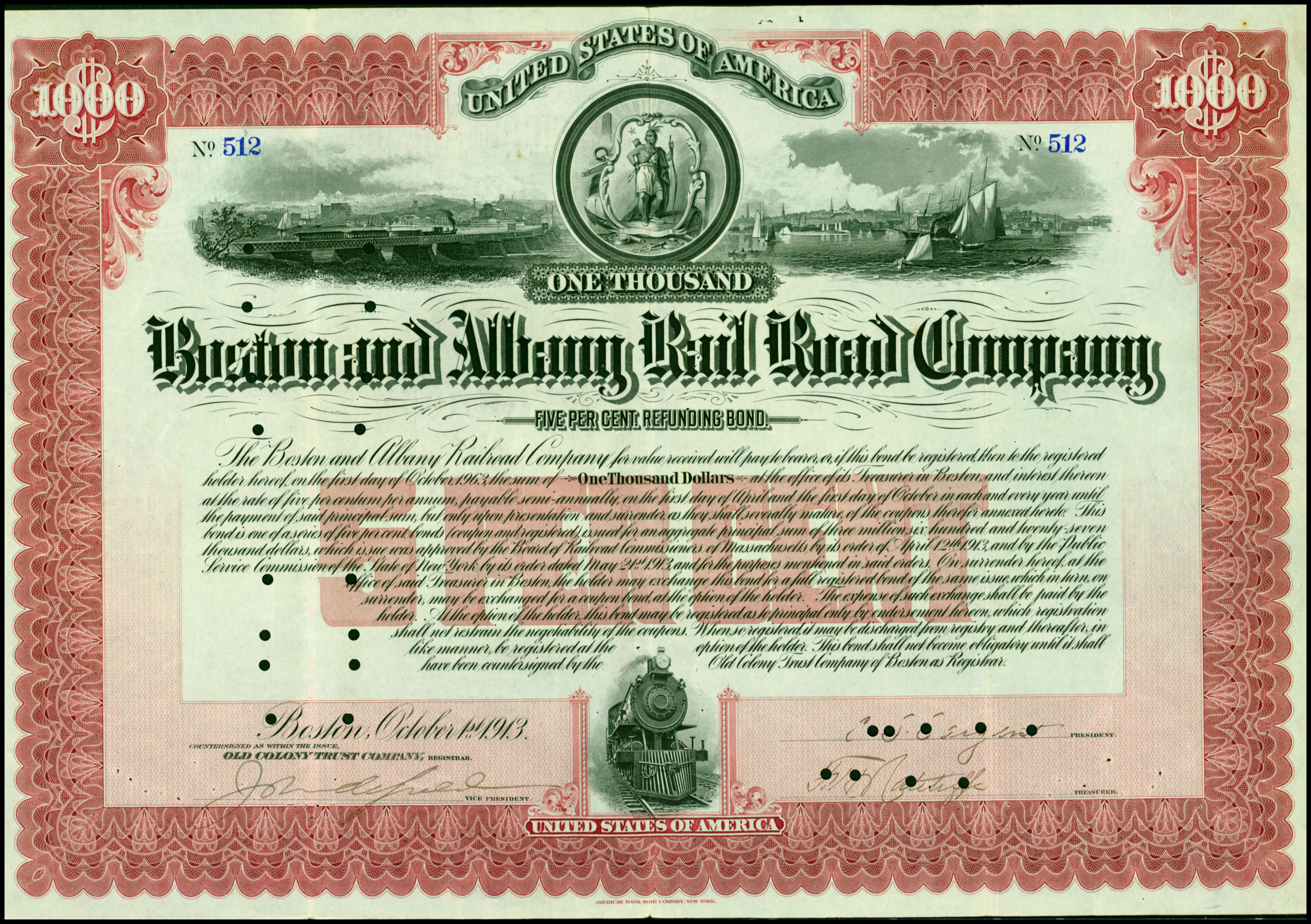
Refunding Bond of the Boston and Albany Rail Road Company, issued 1. October 1913

When the Erie Canal opened in 1825, New York City's advantageous water connection through the Hudson River threatened Boston's historical dominance as a trade center. Since the Berkshires made construction of a canal infeasible, Boston turned to the emerging railroad technology for a share of the freight to and from the Midwestern United States. The Boston and Worcester Railroad was chartered June 23, 1831, and construction began in August 1832. The line opened in sections: to West Newton on April 16, 1834; to Wellesley on July 3; to Ashland on September 20; to Westborough in November 1834; and the full length to Worcester on July 4, 1835. The original single-track line was double-tracked from Boston to Framingham in 1839, and on to Worcester by 1843. In 1843 the B&W introduced season passes to West Newton for $60, effectively introducing the concept of commuter rail.

The Western Railroad was chartered February 15, 1833, and incorporated March 15, 1833, to connect the B&W to the Hudson and Berkshire Railroad at the New York state line. Construction began in 1837, and the Eastern Division to the Connecticut River in Springfield opened on October 1, 1839. The summit of Charlton Hill drainage divide between the Atlantic coast and the Connecticut River is a rock cut 57 mi (92 km) west of Boston. The Western Division, through the Berkshire Hills, opened in sections from both ends from the state line to Pittsfield May 4, 1841, West Springfield to Chester May 24, 1841, Springfield to West Springfield (across the Connecticut River) July 4, 1841, Pittsfield to "Summit" August 9, 1841, and Chester to Summit September 13, 1841. The summit through the Berkshires is known as Washington Hill. Eastbound trains climb 6 mi (9.7 km) of 1.4% grade while westbound trains climb 10 mi (16 km) of slightly steeper grade to reach the 4 mi (6.4 km) of fairly level track across the drainage divide between the Connecticut and Hudson Rivers. On October 4, 1841, the first train ran along the full route. The only true tunnel on the B&A is State Line Tunnel in Canaan, New York, about 2 mi (3.2 km) west of the Massachusetts state line. The original bore was augmented by an improved-alignment second tunnel in 1912, and the original bore was abandoned in the late 20th century.

The Castleton and West Stockbridge Railroad was incorporated in New York in 1834 as the New York part of the Western Railroad, and changed its name to the Albany and West Stockbridge Railroad (chartered May 5, 1836, organized May 20). Construction began in December 1840 and the line opened from Greenbush (east of Albany) to Chatham on December 21, 1841, and to the Massachusetts state line on September 12, 1842. It was leased to the Western Railroad for 50 years from November 11, 1841. This railroad replaced the Hudson and Berkshire Railroad east of Chatham, which was abandoned around 1860.

The connection from Boston to Albany formed the longest and most expensive point-to-point railroad yet constructed in the United States. Two mergers, on September 4, 1867, and December 28, 1870, brought the three companies, along with the Hudson and Boston Railroad, together into one company, known as the Boston and Albany Railroad. The New York Central and Hudson River Railroad leased the B&A for 99 years from July 1, 1900. This lease passed to the New York Central Railroad in 1914; throughout this, the B&A kept its own branding in the public eye. The NYC merged into Penn Central on February 1, 1968.

New York Central began a major modernization program in 1924. The Castleton Cut-Off with a very large hi-level bridge over the Hudson River was built from the B&A at Post Road to a new rail yard at Selkirk, New York, to avoid the steep NYC grade from the Hudson River up West Albany Hill. Berkshire locomotives were designed to provide faster freight service over the B&A.

In 1883, the B&A acquired track then owned by the New York and New England Railroad as far as Newton Highlands, and, in 1884, began the construction of a line northwest to the B&A mainline, creating a commuter loop. "The Circuit," as this route was called, officially opened in May 1886, providing double-track operation from downtown Boston through Brookline to Newton Highlands, then north into Riverside, and four tracks on the mainline from Riverside back to downtown so that commuter and mainline operations did not conflict. By 1889, as many as 35 trains traveled the Circuit daily, providing commuter service.

In 1899, the new South Station union station opened in Boston, a few blocks northeast of the old terminal. That terminal had been located on the west side of Utica Street (Boston, from Kneeland Street south to Harvard Street, now part of the South Bay Interchange. Even earlier, the terminal was in the block bounded by Kneeland Street, Beach Street, Albany Street (now Surface Artery), and Lincoln Street.

By the early part of the 20th century, commuter rail service was provided east of Worcester, with intercity rail continuing on west. During the 1940s period of peak passenger volume, the New Haven Railroad (with the cooperation of the New York Central) ran several Boston-New York City trains along the route to Worcester and Springfield and then south. The service included an overnight train with sleeping car service. The last passenger service on the line on April 30, 1971, before the creation of Amtrak was an unnamed Chicago-bound successor to the New York Central's New England States. The intercity trips were taken over by Amtrak on May 1, 1971, and, on January 27, 1973, the MBTA acquired the line east of Framingham. Service beyond Framingham was discontinued October 27, 1975, as the state did not subsidize it. Conrail took over Penn Central on April 1, 1976. On September 26, 1994, some rush hour trains started to serve Worcester on Conrail trackage (which became CSX trackage on June 1, 1999), extending to other times beginning on December 14, 1996. The MBTA acquired the rest of the line from Framingham to Worcester as part of an agreement announced in 2009. As part of the deal, clearances on the line west of Interstate 495 were improved, permitting full double stack service from Selkirk Yard in New York to an expanded CSX intermodal freight facility in Worcester and a transload facility near I-495. The deal was closed on June 17, 2010. CSX's Boston Subdivision retains the right to use certain MBTA-owned track. Norfolk Southern obtained trackage rights as part of CSX's acquisition of Pan Am Railways in 2022, and started operating double-stack intermodal trains over the B&A mainline in January 2026.

Since 1959, the former "Circuit" line, later called the Highland branch, has been used as the grade-separated right-of-way of the MBTA's Green Line D branch light rail line.

== Named trains ==
The Boston & Albany hosted many named long-distance trains of the New York Central system. Below is a list of named trains effective as of November 12, 1939.

=== Westbound ===
- Empire State Express, Boston–Albany–Buffalo–Cleveland–Indianapolis–St. Louis
- The Mohawk, Boston–Albany–Buffalo–Cleveland–Chicago with connection at Cleveland for Indianapolis and St. Louis
- Ohio State Limited, Boston–Albany–Buffalo–Cleveland–Indianapolis–St. Louis with connection at Cleveland for Cincinnati
- New England States, Boston–Albany–Buffalo–Chicago with connection at Buffalo for Ashtabula, Youngstown, thence via Pittsburgh & Lake Erie to Pittsburgh
- The Wolverine, Boston–Albany–Buffalo–Niagara Falls–London (Ont.)–Detroit–Ann Arbor–Chicago
- Lake Shore Limited, Boston–Albany–Buffalo–Cleveland–Chicago
- Southwestern Limited, Boston–Albany–Buffalo–Cleveland–Indianapolis–St. Louis with connection at Cleveland for Cincinnati
- Cleveland Limited, Boston–Albany–Buffalo–Cleveland
- The Niagara, Boston–Albany–Buffalo–Niagara Falls–London (Ont.)–Detroit–Ann Arbor–Chicago with connection to Cleveland and Cincinnati at Buffalo
- The Iroquois, Boston–Albany–Buffalo–Cleveland–Chicago
- South Shore Express, Boston–Albany–Buffalo–Cleveland–Chicago with connection to Chicago via Detroit at Buffalo and to Cincinnati, Indianapolis, and St. Louis at Cleveland

=== Eastbound ===
- The Iroquois, Cleveland–Buffalo–Albany–Boston
- World's Fairliner, Chicago–Cleveland–Buffalo–Albany–Boston with connection from Detroit at Buffalo
- New York Special, Chicago–Ann Arbor–Detroit–London (Ont.)–Niagara Falls–Buffalo–Albany–Boston
- Fifth Avenue Special, Chicago–Cleveland–Buffalo–Albany–Boston
- Southwestern Limited
- The Wolverine
- Ohio State Limited
- New England States
- The Knickerbocker, Cleveland–Buffalo–Albany–Boston
- The Water Level Limited, Chicago–Cleveland–Buffalo–Albany–Boston
- Henry Hudson, Toledo–Cleveland–Buffalo–Albany–Boston with connection from Grand Rapids and Niagara Falls at Buffalo
- Lake Shore Limited
- North Shore Limited, Chicago–Ann Arbor–Detroit–London (Ont.)–Niagara Falls–Buffalo–Albany–Boston
- Maumee–Missourian, Chicago–Cleveland–Buffalo–Albany–Boston
- The Forest City, Chicago–Cleveland–Buffalo–Albany–Boston
- The De Witt Clinton, Chicago–Ann Arbor–Detroit–London (Ont.)–Niagara Falls–Buffalo–Albany–Boston
- Boston Expres, Chicago–Cleveland–Buffalo–Albany–Boston

=== Southbound ===
- New York Express, North Adams–Pittsfield–Chatham–New York City

== Branches ==
=== Grand Junction ===
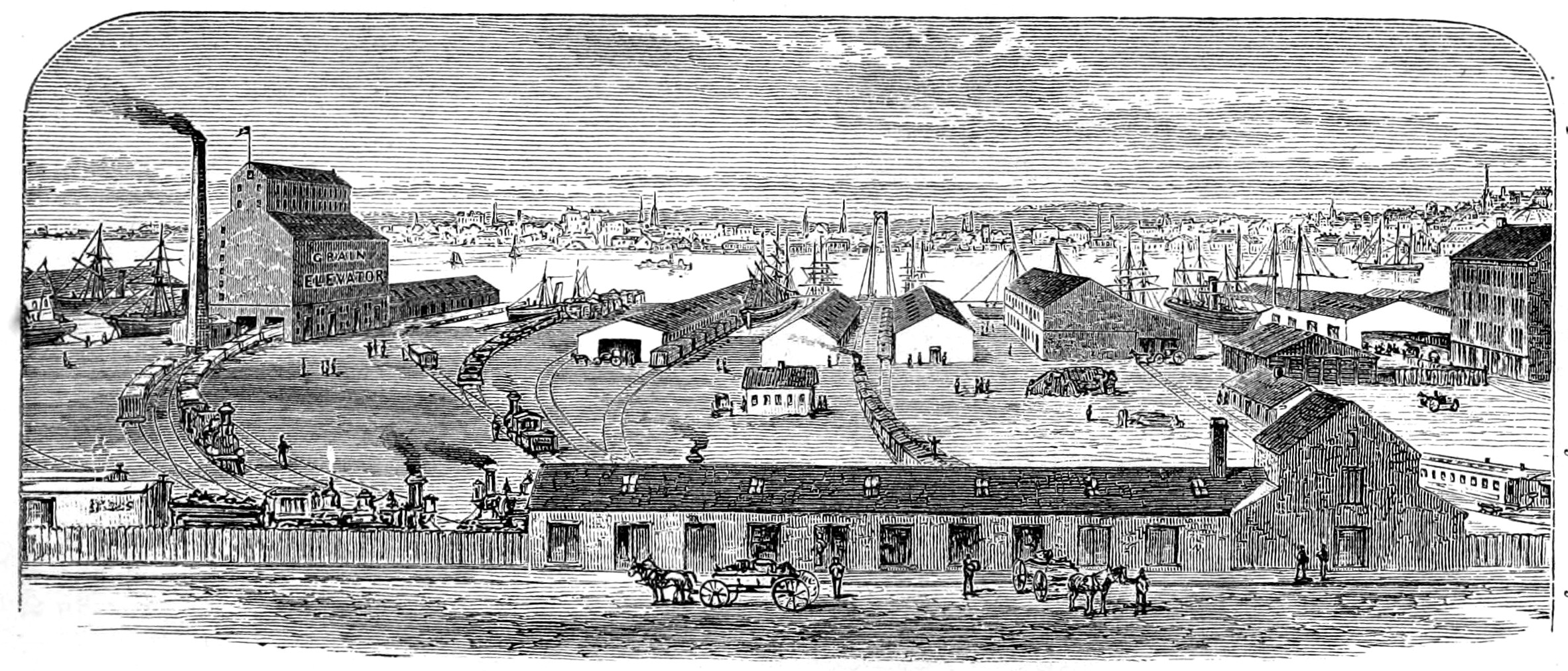
Grand Junction wharves in East Boston

The Grand Junction Railroad was chartered in 1847 as a reincorporation of the 1846 Chelsea Branch Railroad, meant to connect the lines north and west of Boston. The first section, from East Boston to Somerville, opened in 1849, and the extension to the B&W in Allston opened in 1856. The Eastern Railroad leased the line from 1852 to 1866, using part of it as their new main line. In 1866 the B&W bought the line (keeping trackage rights for the Eastern).

=== Brookline/Highland ===
The Brookline branch split from the main line in the west part of Boston's Back Bay, running southwest for 1.55 mi (2.5 km) to Brookline (the current location of Brookline Village station). It opened in 1847. In Summer 1852 the Charles River Branch Railroad extended the line to Newton Upper Falls; this would eventually become part of the New England Railroad, an alternate route to New York.

In 1882 the B&A bought part of the Charles River Branch, and in 1884 they built a line from Riverside to the branch, forming the Highland branch, Newton Highlands branch, or "Newton circuit". Service ended in 1958, and what is now the MBTA Green Line D branch light rail line started using the tracks in 1959.

=== Newton Lower Falls ===
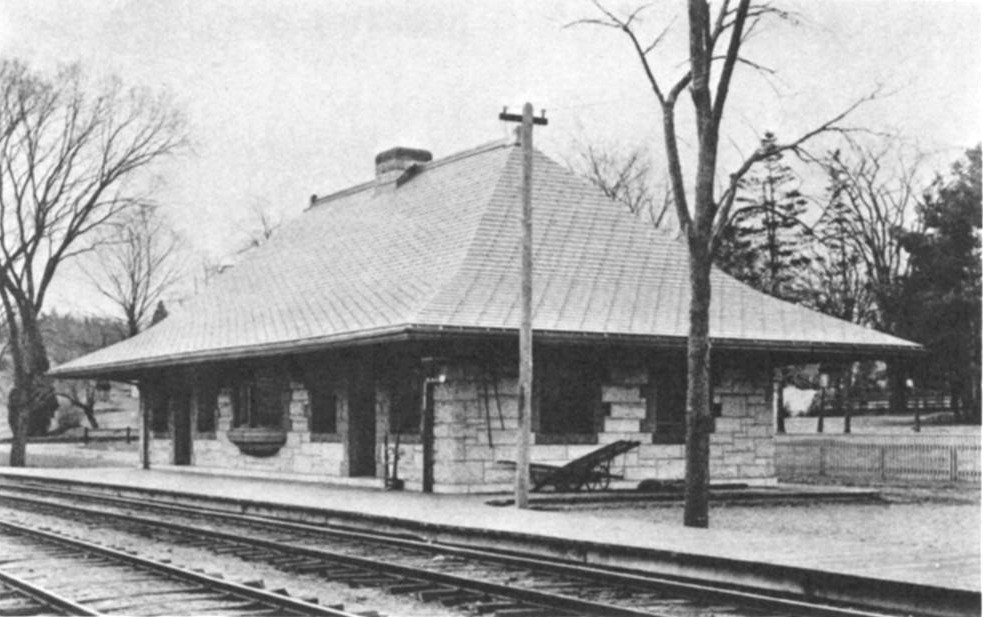
Newton Lower Falls station

The short 1.25-mile (2.01 km) Newton Lower Falls Branch opened in 1847, splitting from the main line just west of Riverside to Newton Lower Falls.

=== Saxonville ===
The Saxonville Branch opened in 1846, running 3.87 miles (6.2 km) from Natick to Saxonville. It has been converted into the Cochituate Rail Trail.

=== Framingham ===
The Framingham branch opened in 1849, running 2.06 miles (3.3 km) from Framingham to Framingham Centre. The Agricultural Branch Railroad was incorporated in 1847 and opened in 1855, continuing the branch to Northborough, and to Pratts Junction in 1866. It was leased by the B&W in 1853, but consolidated into the Boston, Clinton, Fitchburg and New Bedford Railroad in 1876 and leased to the Old Colony Railroad in 1879 after changing its name to the Boston, Clinton and Fitchburg Railroad in 1867. This company also used the Framingham branch as part of its main line.

=== Milford ===
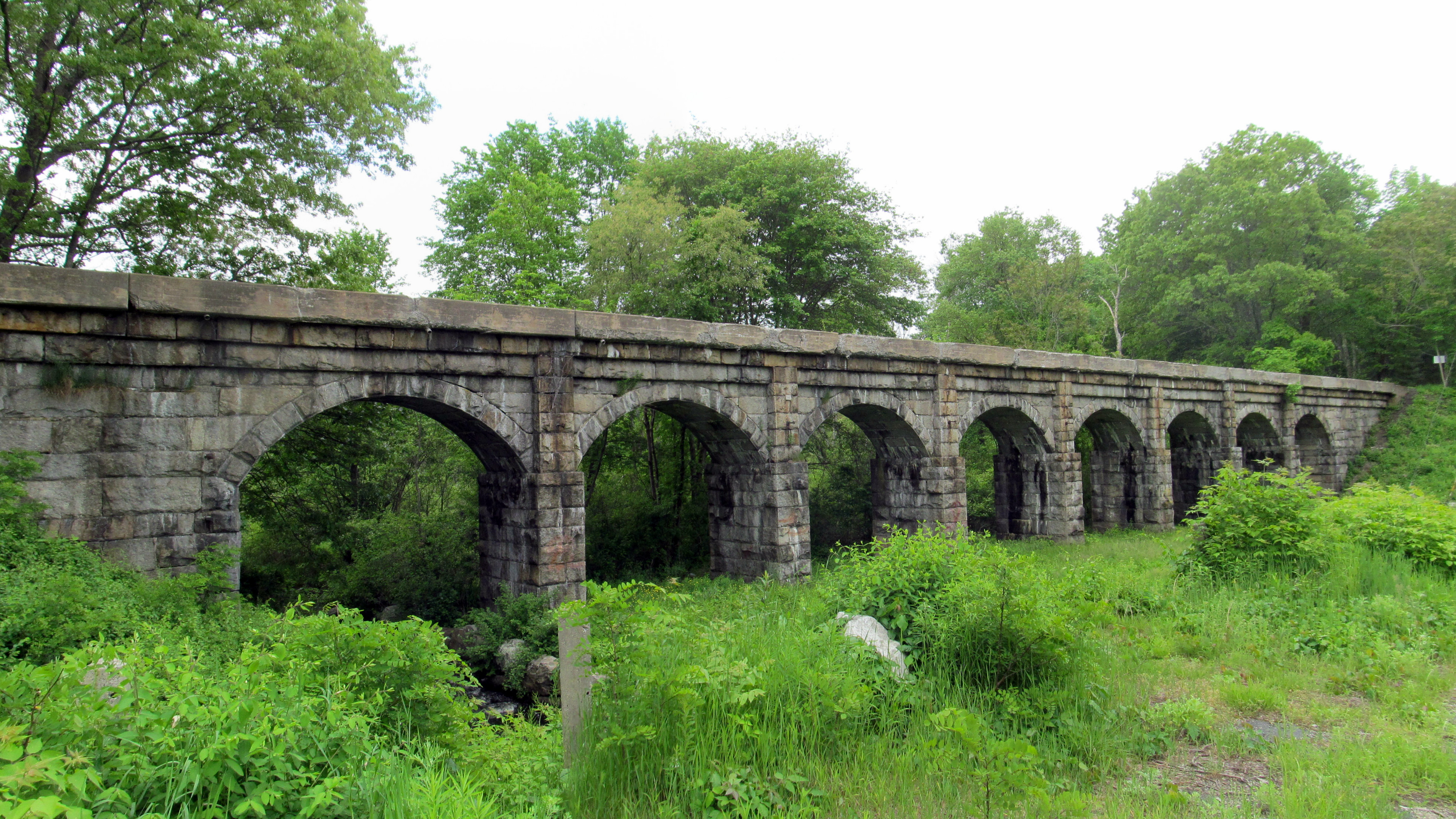
Former viaduct on the Milford Branch

In 1847, the 11.97 mile (19.3 km) Milford Branch, splitting at Framingham, opened. A connection was later made at Milford to the Milford and Woonsocket Railroad and Hopkinton Railway.

Most of the right-of-way (except for the short active section in Framingham) has been converted to part of the Upper Charles Rail Trail.

=== Millbury ===
The 3.07 mile (4.9 km) Millbury Branch opened in 1846 from a split at Millbury Junction on the Grafton/Millbury line to Millbury.

=== Webster ===
The Providence, Webster and Springfield Railroad was chartered in 1882, opened in 1884, and always leased to and operated by the B&A. The line formed a branch of the B&A from Webster Junction in Auburn to the Worcester and Norwich Railroad in Webster, with a short branch (East Village branch) in Webster to East Village.

=== Spencer ===
The Spencer Railroad opened and was leased to the B&A in 1879, as a short branch from South Spencer to Spencer. The B&A outright bought it in 1889.

=== North Brookfield ===
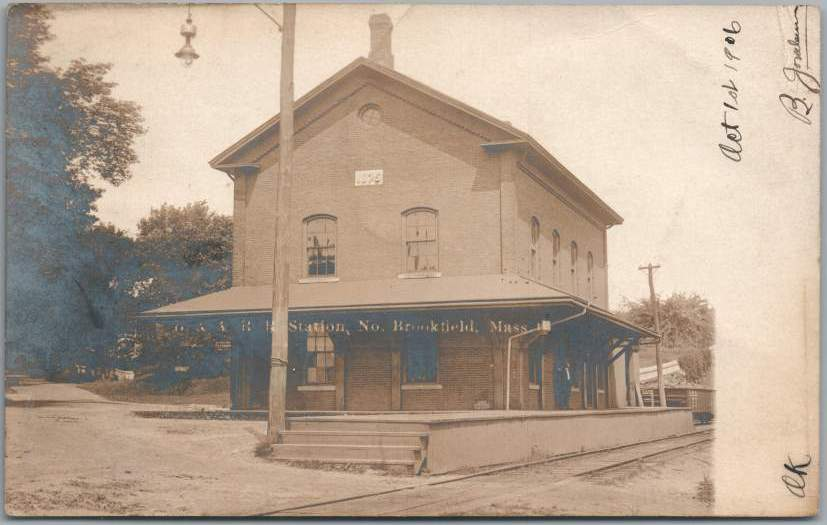
North Brookfield station around 1906

The North Brookfield Railroad was chartered in 1874, incorporated in 1875 and opened in 1876, branching from the B&A in East Brookfield and running to North Brookfield. It was leased to the B&A from opening.

=== Ware River ===
The Ware River Railroad was chartered in 1868, running from Palmer to the Cheshire Railroad in Winchendon. The first section, from Palmer to Gilbertville, opened in 1870, and the rest in 1873. Until 1873 it was leased to and operated by the New London Northern Railroad; at that time the lease was transferred to the B&A, as a reorganization of the earlier company.

=== Athol ===
The Athol and Enfield Railroad and Springfield and North-Eastern Railroad were chartered in 1869, and succeeded by the Springfield, Athol and North-eastern Railroad in 1872, opening in 1873 as a branch from Athol Junction in Springfield to the Vermont and Massachusetts Railroad in Athol. The B&A bought the line in 1880. The majority of the line was closed in the 1930s due to the formation of the Quabbin Reservoir.

=== Chester and Becket ===
The Chester and Becket Railroad was chartered in 1896 and opened in 1897 from Chester west to quarries in Becket. It was always operated by the B&A.

=== North Adams ===
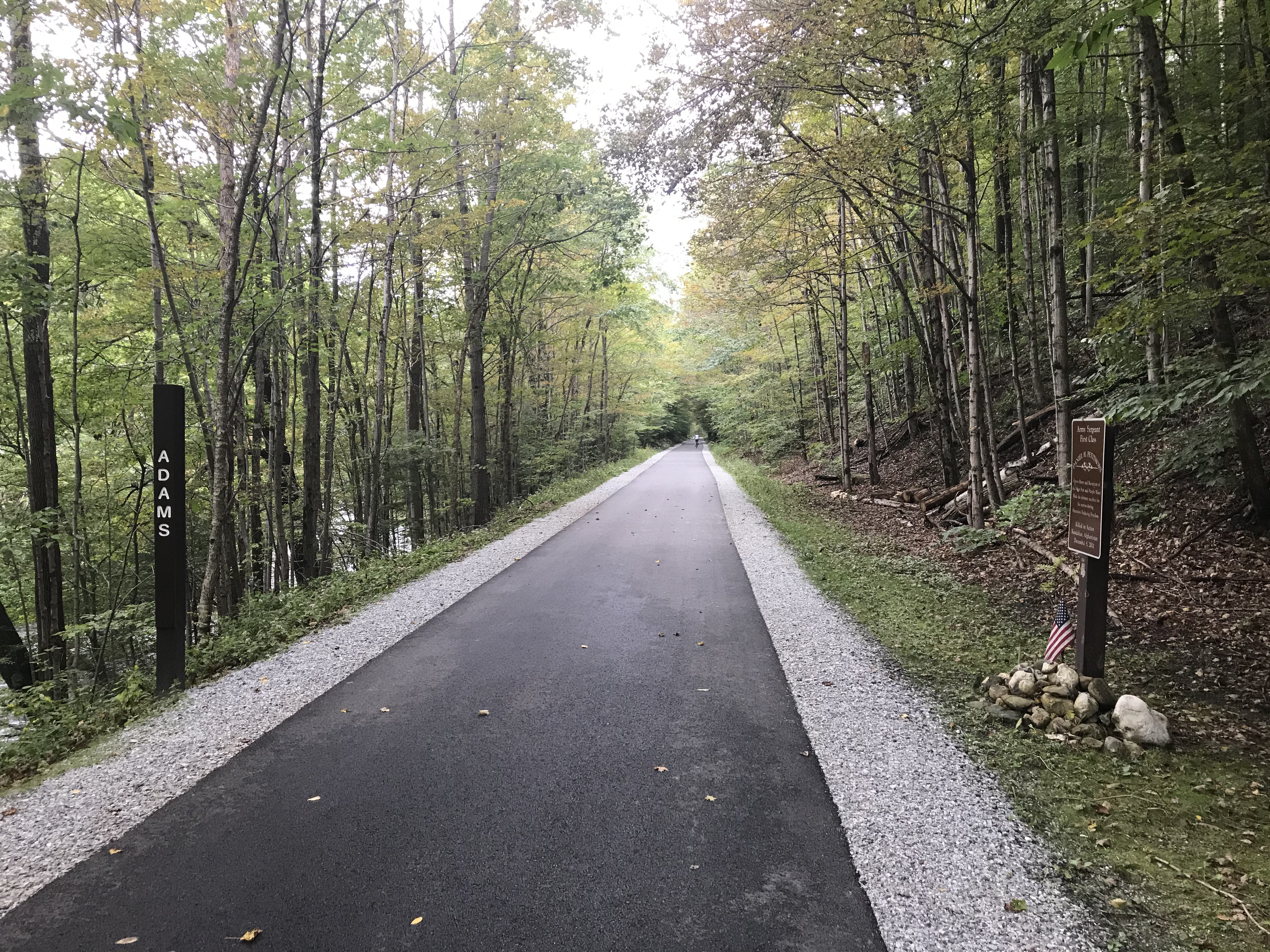
The Ashuwillticook Rail Trail, formerly part of the Pittsfield and North Adams Railroad

The Pittsfield and North Adams Railroad was incorporated in 1842 and opened in 1846, having been already leased to the Western Railroad. It ran from North Adams Junction in Pittsfield to North Adams, where it connected to the Troy and Greenfield Railroad. Surviving structures along this branch include the Pittsfield & North Adams Passenger Station and Baggage & Express House in Adams, Massachusetts. Most of this line has been turned into the Ashuwillticook Rail Trail, but tourist passenger trains now (2021) operate between North Adams and Adams.

=== Hudson ===
The Hudson and Berkshire Railroad was chartered in 1828 to build a line from Hudson, New York, to the Massachusetts state line. Construction began in 1835 and was completed in 1838. The company was leased to the Berkshire Railroad, along with the connecting West Stockbridge Railroad, in 1844, but was bought by the Western Railroad in 1854. The name was changed to the Hudson and Boston Railroad in 1855, and the part east of Chatham was abandoned around 1860, as it duplicated the newer Albany and West Stockbridge Railroad (part of the B&A main line). The rest of the line formed a cutoff between the New York Central and Hudson River Railroad towards New York City and the B&A.

=== Post Road/Selkirk ===
The Post Road branch or Selkirk branch was originally built as part of the Hudson River Connecting Railroad, a southern bypass of the Albany area. It opened in 1924, and the part of it from the B&A at Post Road Crossing (the crossing of the Albany Post Road) to Schodack Junction on the east side of the Hudson River became the B&A Post Road branch. The rest became the New York Central Railroad's Castleton Cut-off.

== Station and landscape design program ==
The B&A undertook a significant program of improvement and beautification in the 1880s and 1890s. The B&A hired architect Alexander Rice Esty who designed the Boston passenger station which was completed in 1881, the year of Esty's death. That same year, the B&A hired architect Henry Hobson Richardson to design a series of passenger stations. Over the next five years, Richardson was responsible for nine B&A stations (Auburndale, Chestnut Hill, Elliot, Waban, and Woodland (Newton, MA), Wellesley Hills, Brighton, South Framingham, and Palmer), as well as a dairy building; he also provided designs for passenger cars. At the same time, the B&A hired landscape architect Frederick Law Olmsted to design the grounds of several stations and to work with the railroad to establish a landscape beautification program for other stations. After Richardson's death, the B&A commissioned his successors, Shepley, Rutan and Coolidge, to design 23 additional stations between 1886 and 1894. The B&A's innovative program of well-designed stations and landscape served as a model for several other railroads around the turn of the 20th century.

== Main line station listing ==
Mileposts noted here reflect the 1899 opening of South Station, which extended the line about 0.2 miles (0.32 km) from the previous Kneeland Street terminal.

State	Milepost	City	Station	Notes
MA	0.0	Boston	South Station	Replaced an older terminal.
MA	1.3	Boston	Back Bay	Originally opened around 1880 as Columbus Avenue; replaced by Huntington Avenue and Trinity Place in 1899. Those stations were closed in 1964, when Back Bay station began serving the B&A.
MA	2.5	Boston	Lansdowne	Former junction with the Highland branch. Formerly known as Yawkey; former station at the site was variously known as Beacon Street, Brookline Junction, and Mill Dam.
MA	3.1	Boston	University	Closed in April 1959; originally Cottage Farm
MA	3.5	Boston	Junction with Grand Junction Branch (not a station)	
MA	4.3	Boston	Allston	Closed in April 1959.
MA	4.7	Boston	Boston Landing	
MA	5.1	Boston	Brighton	Closed in April 1959
MA	5.9	Boston	Faneuil	Closed in April 1959.
MA	7.2	Newton	Newton	Closed in April 1959.
MA	8.1	Newton	Newtonville	
MA	9.5	Newton	West Newton	
MA	10.5	Newton	Auburndale	
MA	10.9	Newton	Riverside	Closed October 27, 1977. Former junction with Highland branch and Newton Lower Falls Branch.
MA	12.7	Wellesley	Wellesley Farms	
MA	13.5	Wellesley	Wellesley Hills	
MA	14.8	Wellesley	Wellesley Square	Originally Wellesley.
MA	16.2	Wellesley	Lake Crossing	
MA	17.7	Natick	Natick Center	Former junction with Saxonville branch
MA	19.1	Natick	Walkerville	
MA	20.0	Natick	West Natick	
MA	21.5	Framingham	Framingham	Junction with Milford Branch, Fitchburg Subdivision (formerly Agricultural Branch), and Framingham Secondary
MA	24.2	Ashland	Ashland	Former location; closed in 1960. Former junction with Hopkinton Railway (NYNH&H)
MA	25.2	Ashland	Ashland	
MA	27.4	Southborough	Southborough	Former station at the site was known as Cordaville
MA	28.1	Southborough	Southville	
MA	31.9	Westborough	Westborough	Former location; closed in 1960.
MA	33.9	Westborough	Westborough	
MA	36.4	Grafton	Grafton	
MA	37.8	Grafton	North Grafton	Closed in 1960. Junction with Grafton and Upton Railroad
MA	39.1	Millbury	Millbury Junction	Former junction with Millbury branch
MA	44.3	Worcester	Worcester	Junction with Providence and Worcester Railroad (NYNH&H), Norwich and Worcester Railroad (NYNH&H), Worcester Branch (B&M) and Gardner Branch (B&M)
MA	45.4	Worcester	South Worcester	Also called Hammond Street and Worcester Junction
MA	47.9	Worcester	Jamesville	
MA	50.6	Auburn	Webster Junction (not a station) – junction with Webster Branch	
MA	53.0	Leicester	Rochdale	
MA	57.5	Charlton	Charlton	
MA	61.9	Spencer	South Spencer	Former junction with Spencer Branch
MA	63.7	East Brookfield	East Brookfield	Former junction with North Brookfield Branch
MA	66.9	Brookfield	Brookfield	
MA	69.6	West Brookfield	West Brookfield	
MA	72.6	Warren	Warren	
MA	74.9	Warren	West Warren	
MA	78.4	Brimfield	West Brimfield	
MA	83.6	Palmer	Palmer	Junction with Ware River Branch and New England Central Railroad (formerly Central Vermont Railway)
MA	88.7	Wilbraham	North Wilbraham	
MA	92.5	Springfield	Oak Street	Also known as Indian Orchard. Former junction with Athol Branch connector
MA	96.0	Springfield	Athol Junction (not a station) – junction with Athol Branch	
MA	98.3	Springfield	Springfield	Junction with New Haven–Springfield Line (NYNH&H), Springfield and New London Railroad (NYNH&H) and Connecticut River Line (B&M)
MA	100.8	West Springfield	West Springfield	Also called Mittineague
MA	102.2	West Springfield	Agawam Junction (not a station) – former junction with Central New England Railway (NYNH&H)	
MA	107.9	Westfield	Westfield	Junction with Canal Line (NYNH&H)
MA	112.0	Russell	Woronoco	
MA	115.4	Russell	Russell	
MA	119.2	Huntington	Huntington	Also known as Chester Village.
MA	125.8	Chester	Chester	Former junction with Chester and Becket branch. Also known as Chester factories.
MA	130.6	Middlefield	Middlefield	
MA	134.1	Becket	Becket	
MA	137.6	Washington	Washington	
MA	141.9	Hinsdale	Hinsdale	
MA	145.2	Dalton	Dalton	
MA	148.2	Pittsfield	North Adams Junction	Junction with North Adams branch
MA	150.6	Pittsfield	Pittsfield	Junction with Stockbridge and Pittsfield Railroad (NYNH&H)
MA	154.2	Pittsfield	West Pittsfield	
MA	156.7	Richmond	Richmond Summit	
MA	158.8	Richmond	Richmond	
MA	159.8	Richmond	Richmond Furnace	
MA	161.8	West Stockbridge	State Line	Former junction with West Stockbridge Railroad (NYNH&H)
New York	163.6	Canaan	Edwards Park	
New York	167.0	Canaan	Canaan	
New York	171.3	Chatham	East Chatham	
New York	175.0	Chatham	Payn's	
New York	177.2	Ghent	Chatham	Former junction with Hudson branch, Harlem Line (NYC) and Chatham and Lebanon Valley Railroad (Rutland)
New York	182.1	Chatham	Chatham Center	
New York	184.7	Kinderhook	Niverville	
New York	187.4	Schodack	Post Road	Junction with Post Road Branch
New York	190.1	Schodack	Van Hoesen	
New York	192.4	Schodack	Brookview	
New York	195.4	East Greenbush	East Greenbush	
New York	199.8	Rensselaer	Albany-Rensselaer	Junction with Hudson River Railroad (NYC), Hudson River Bridge (NYC) and Troy and Greenbush Railroad (NYC)
New York	201	Albany	Albany	
Colors: current Amtrak station current Amtrak and MBTA station current MBTA station

== See also ==
- Chester train wreck, an 1893 accident that resulted in 14 deaths
