= Milford Branch =

Former railway line in Massachusetts

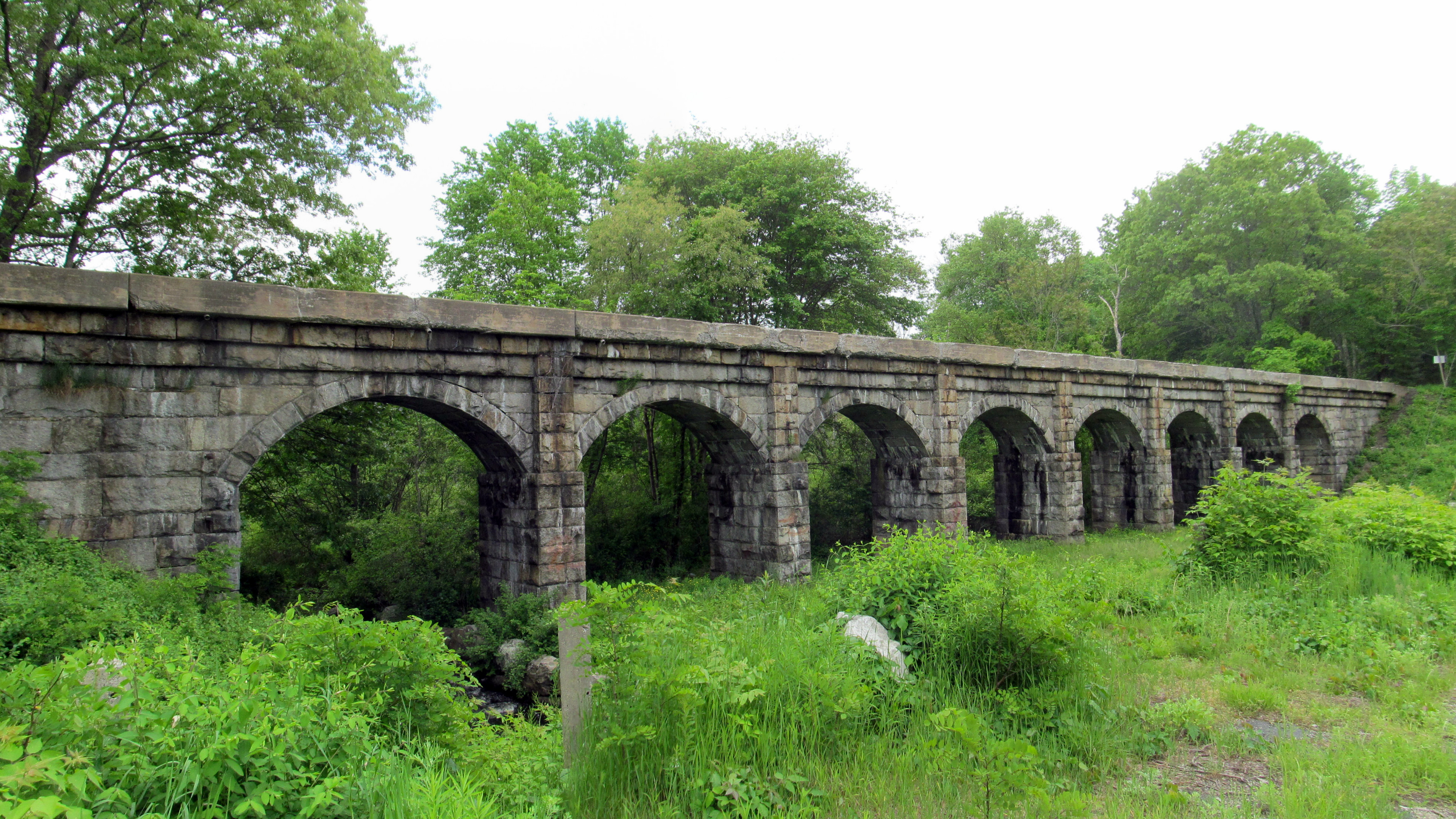
- Holliston viaduct along the Milford Branch

Overview
- Status: Mostly abandoned
- Owner: CSX (North of Whitney Street in Sherborn); Upper Charles Rail Trail (South of Whitney Street in Sherborn)
- Locale: MetroWest; Towns of Framingham, Sherborn, Holliston, and Milford
- Termini: Framingham; Milford
- Continues from: Boston and Worcester Railroad, now the Framingham/Worcester Line
- Stations: 8

Service
- Type: Railroad
- System: Boston and Albany Railroad

History
- Commenced: 1847
- Opened: September 1847
- Completed: July 1848
- Closed: 1980

Technical
- Line length: 11.97 miles (19.26 km)
- Character: heavy rail, abandoned
- Track gauge: 4 ft 8 1/2 in (1,435 mm)
- Electrification: None

The Milford Branch is a mostly abandoned railroad line in Massachusetts. The line formerly ran from Milford to Framingham, traveling through Holliston and Sherborn, connecting to the Boston Subdivision in Framingham and the Milford Secondary in Milford. The line was originally part of the Boston and Albany Railroad, and the end of the line was later abandoned under Penn Central, before most of the rest of the line was abandoned by Conrail. A short portion of the line in Framingham is still active. Although the line passes through Sherborn and terminates in Framingham, the majority of the line lies in Holliston.

== History ==
The Boston and Worcester Railroad began construction of the Milford Branch in early 1847, heading south from their mainline at Framingham, and opened from Framingham to Holliston by September 1847. and by July 1848 had reached its southern terminus in Milford. Originally, the line was proposed to continue south to Woonsocket, Rhode Island, but this would have interfered with the Norfolk County Railroad, so it was decided to terminate the line in Milford.

In Milford, the line interchanged with what was then known as the Hopkinton and Milford Railroad, later the Milford and Woonsocket Railroad, and today's CSX Milford Secondary. This line was built in stages between 1869 and 1872. In 1893, the Natick Street Railway expanded south through Sherborn to Ashland, but the Milford Branch remained the largest railroad in Milford.

The line continued thriving throughout the early 20th century, but by the 1950s, as with many railroads across the country, the line began struggling. By 1958, the line had only one train per day in each direction, running as a shuttle to/from Framingham during the rush hour only and serving Holliston and Milford stations only. Passenger service could not last much longer, and the Milford Branch's very last passenger train arrived into Milford on the evening of March 28, 1959, after 111 years of service.

Freight service still continued under the B&A, but the line was by this point an unimportant branchline. Eventually, as with the rest of the former B&A, the Milford Branch came under the control of Penn Central in their 1968 creation. The line continued having minimal freight service throughout the 1960s and 70s, but in the early 1980s, the line—which was then owned by Conrail—was abandoned. Throughout the 1980s, 90s, and into the 2000s, the line sat abandoned, with tracks at least partially intact until 2004.

A rail yard on the line in Framingham, known as the Constructive Placement (CP) yard, was once used by Mazda, Ford, and General Motors to unload cars delivered by rail. Automobile unloading stopped in February 2009 after operations moved to East Brookfield, Massachusetts. The yard started being used for a rail transloading facility in July 2024, with CSX moving railcars in and out of the yard 2-3 times per week.

Starting in 2017, portions of the rail line began being converted into the Upper Charles Rail Trail, which as of 2024 has been completed from Whitney Street in Sherborn south to Downtown Milford.

=== Remnants ===
The following remnants still exist along the line:

- The right-of-way from Sherborn to Milford is preserved as the Upper Charles Rail Trail.
- The East Holliston, Holliston, and Milford station buildings are still standing.
- The 8-Arch Bridge, also known as the Holliston Viaduct or the Woolen Mill Bridge, still stands slightly north of Holliston.
- The Phipps Tunnel still remains just south of Holliston.

=== Modern transit ===
The MetroWest Regional Transit Authority route 6 roughly parallels the former path of the line.

== Station listing ==
| Town | Station | Notes |
|---|---|---|
| Framingham | Framingham | still active as an MBTA and Amtrak station |
| Sherborn | Whitney | |
| Holliston | East Holliston | station building still remains |
| Holliston | Holliston | station building still remains |
| Holliston | Metcalf | |
| Holliston | Braggville | |
| Milford | Rocky Hill | |
| Milford | Milford | station building still remains |

== Gallery ==
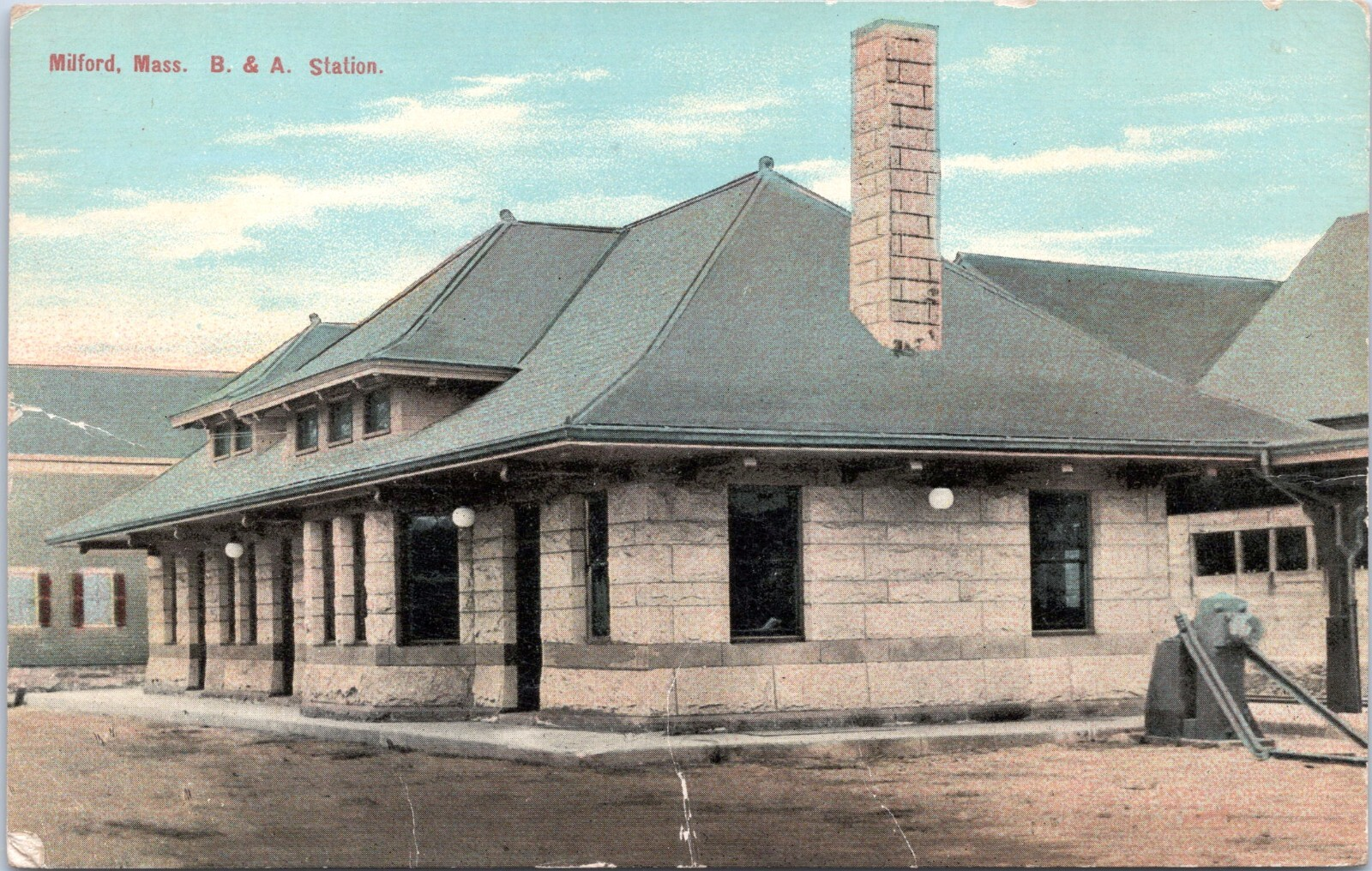
Milford station in 1913

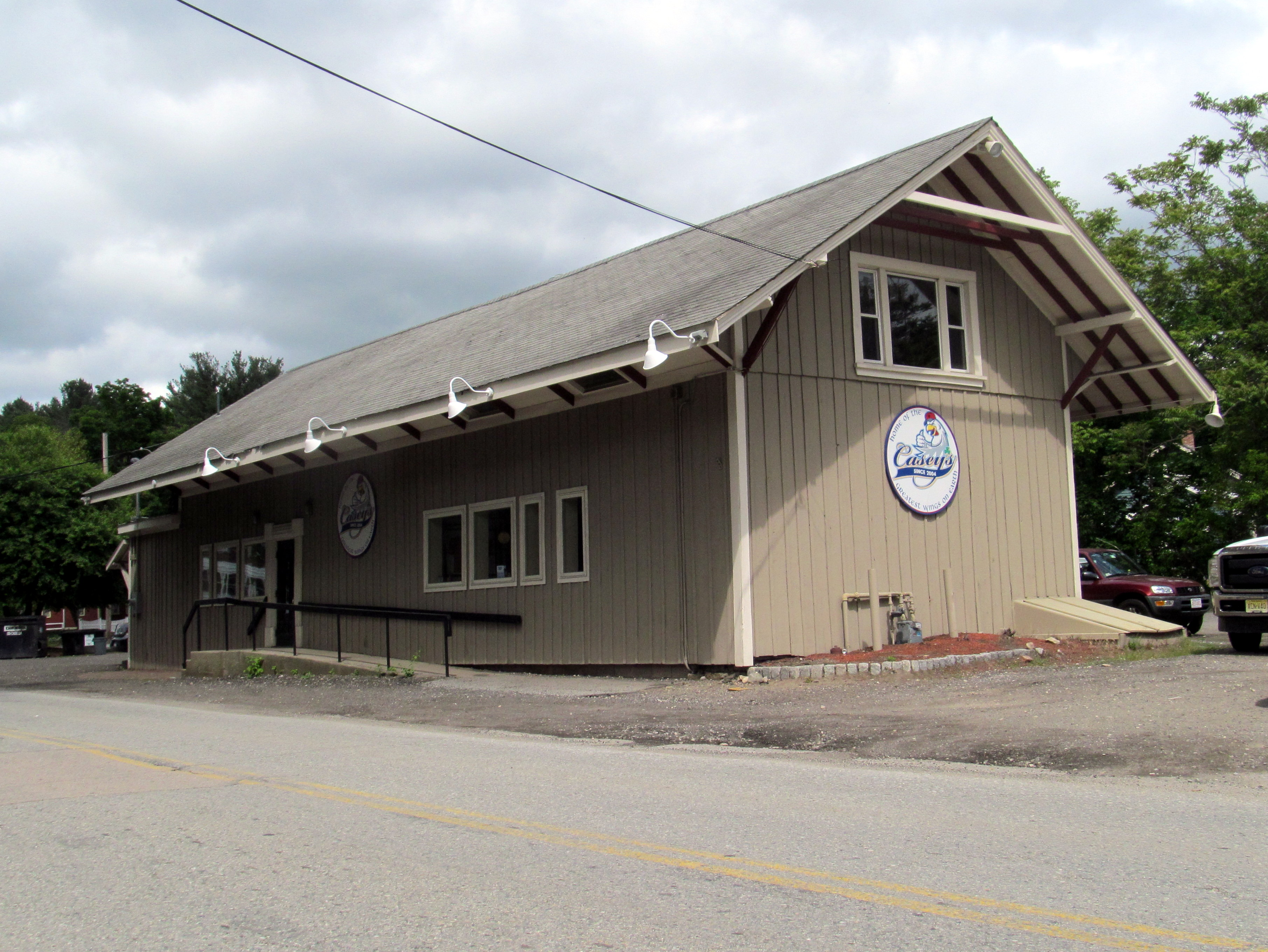
The former Holliston station building in 2017

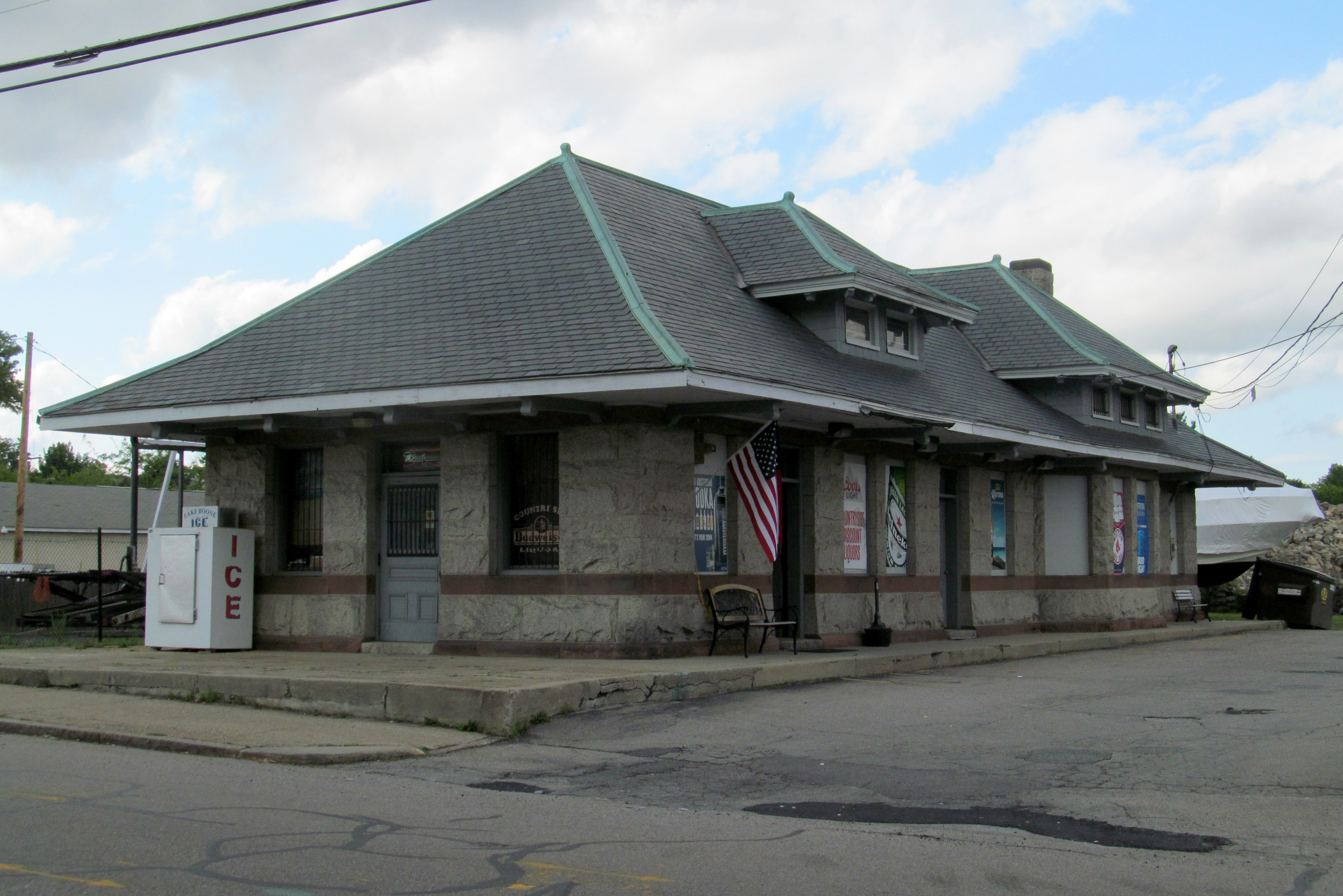
The former Milford station building in 2017

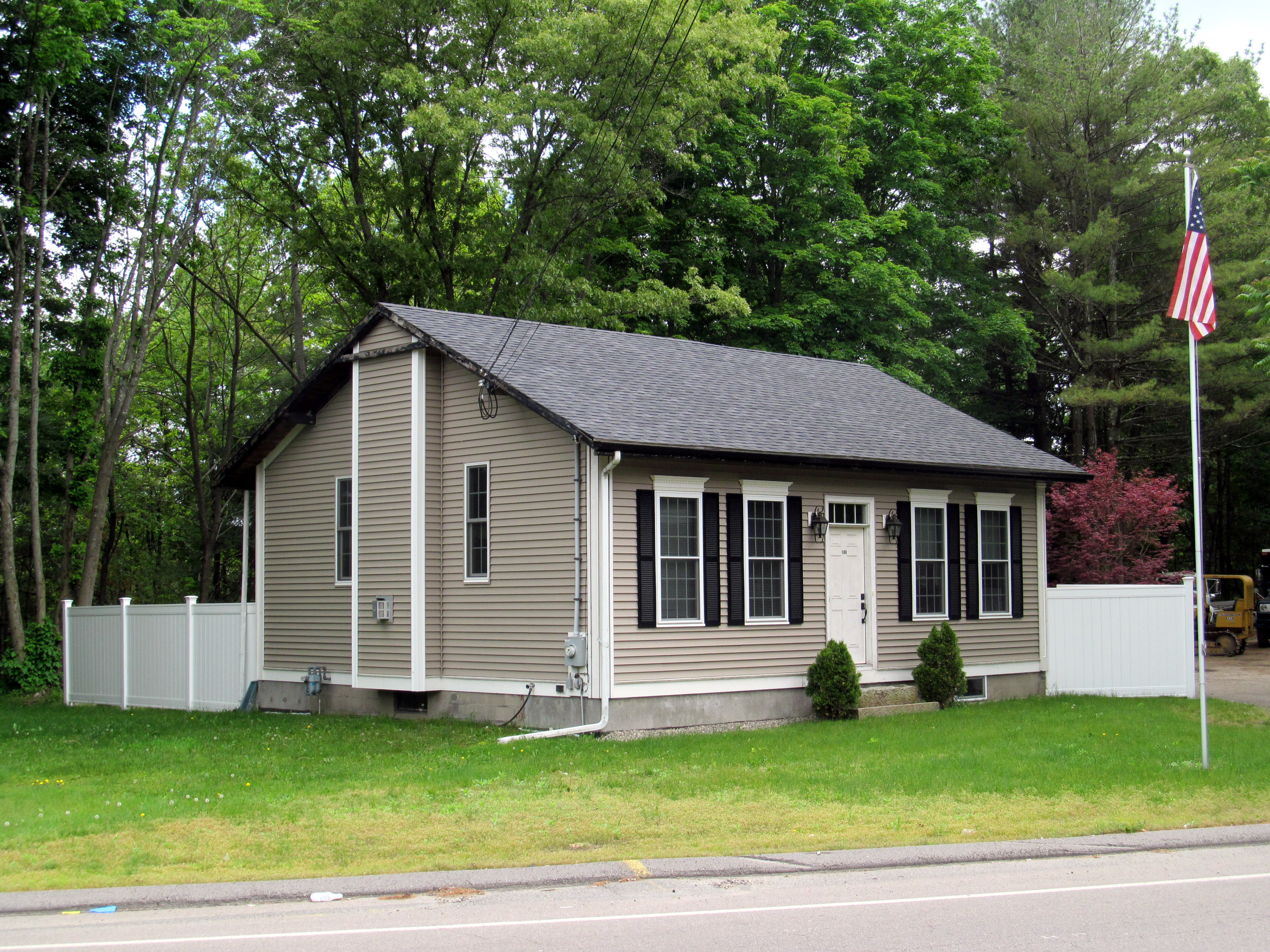
The former East Holliston station in 2017

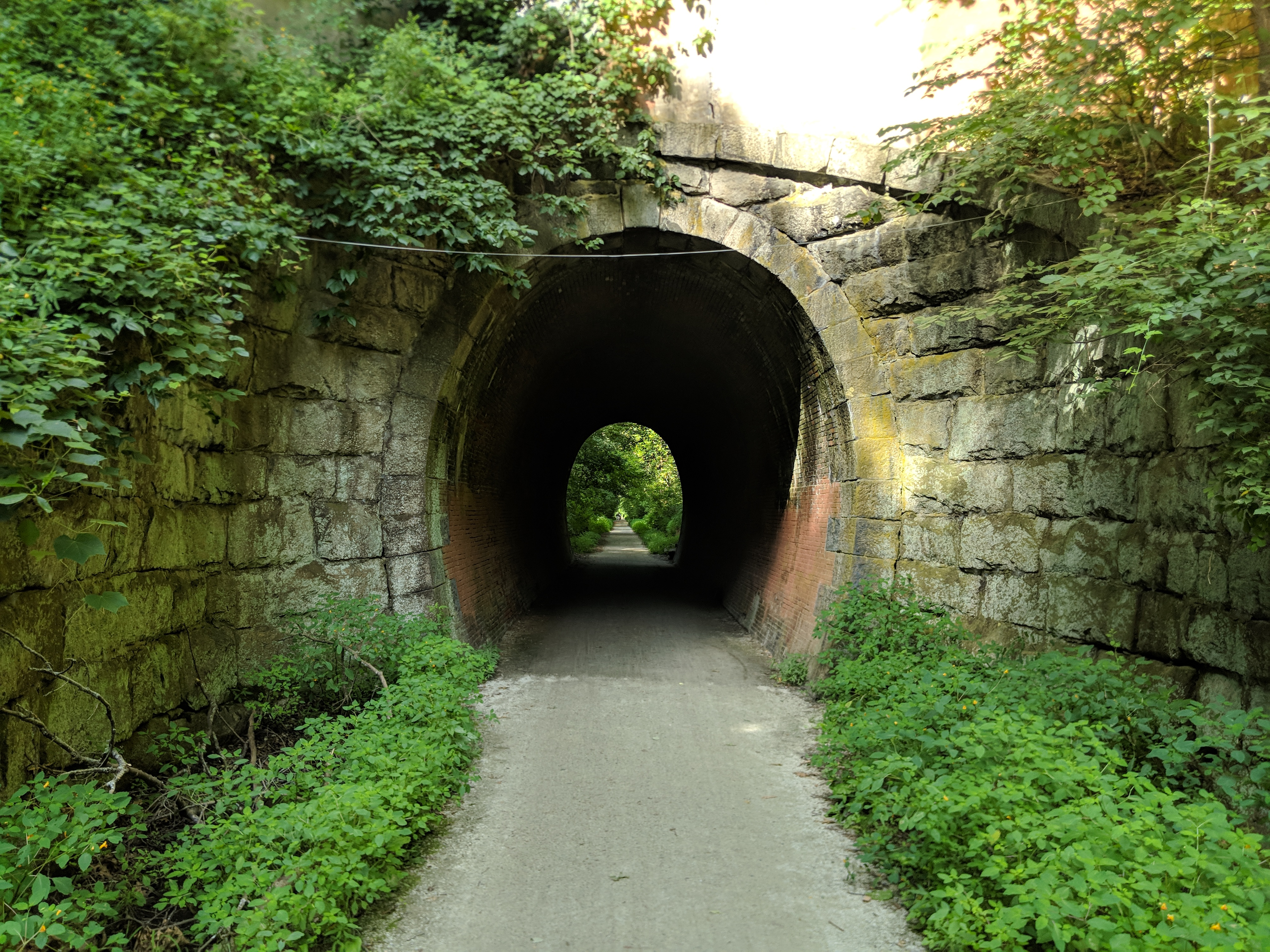
The Phipps Tunnel in Holliston

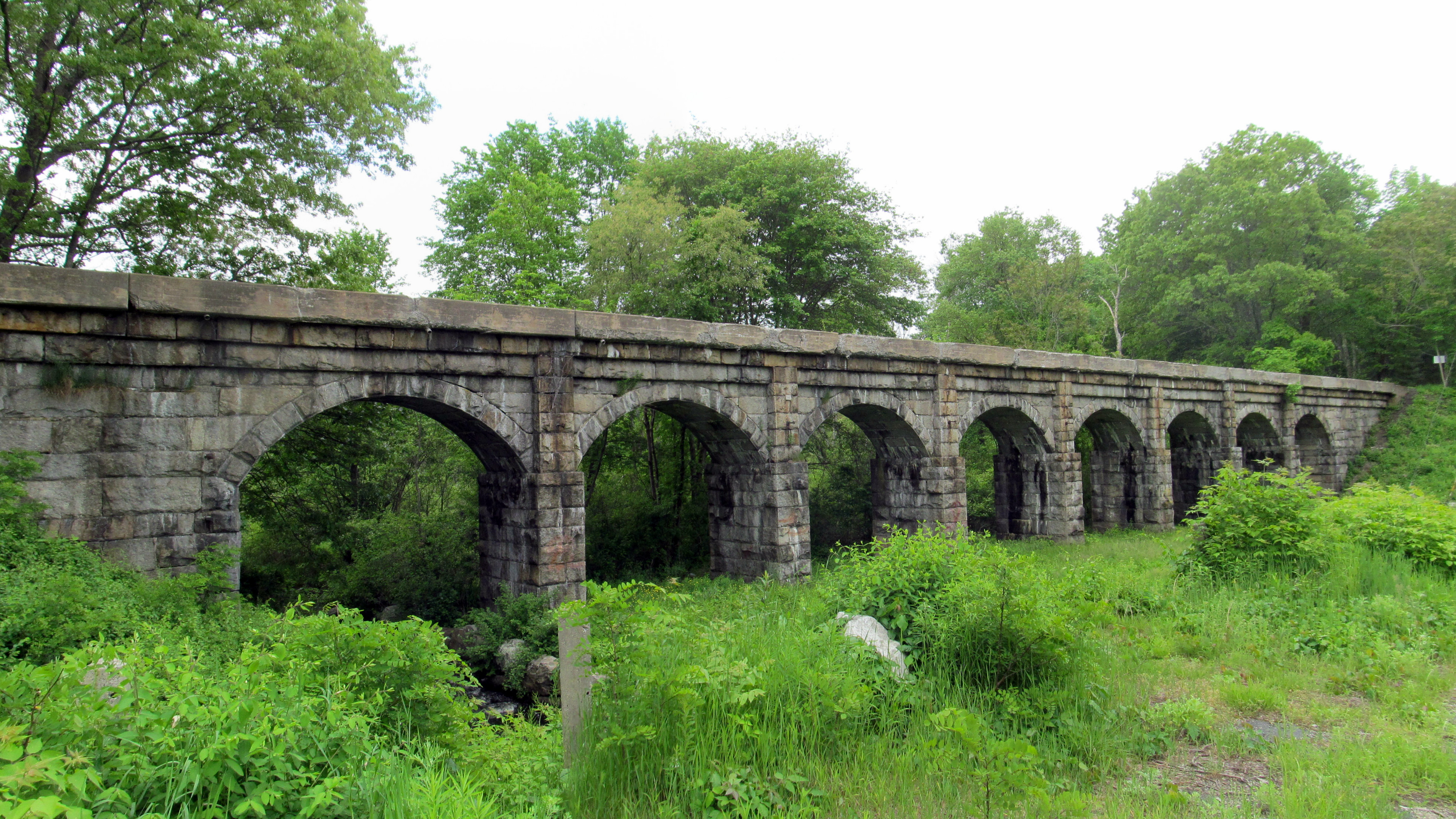
The Holliston Viaduct in 2017

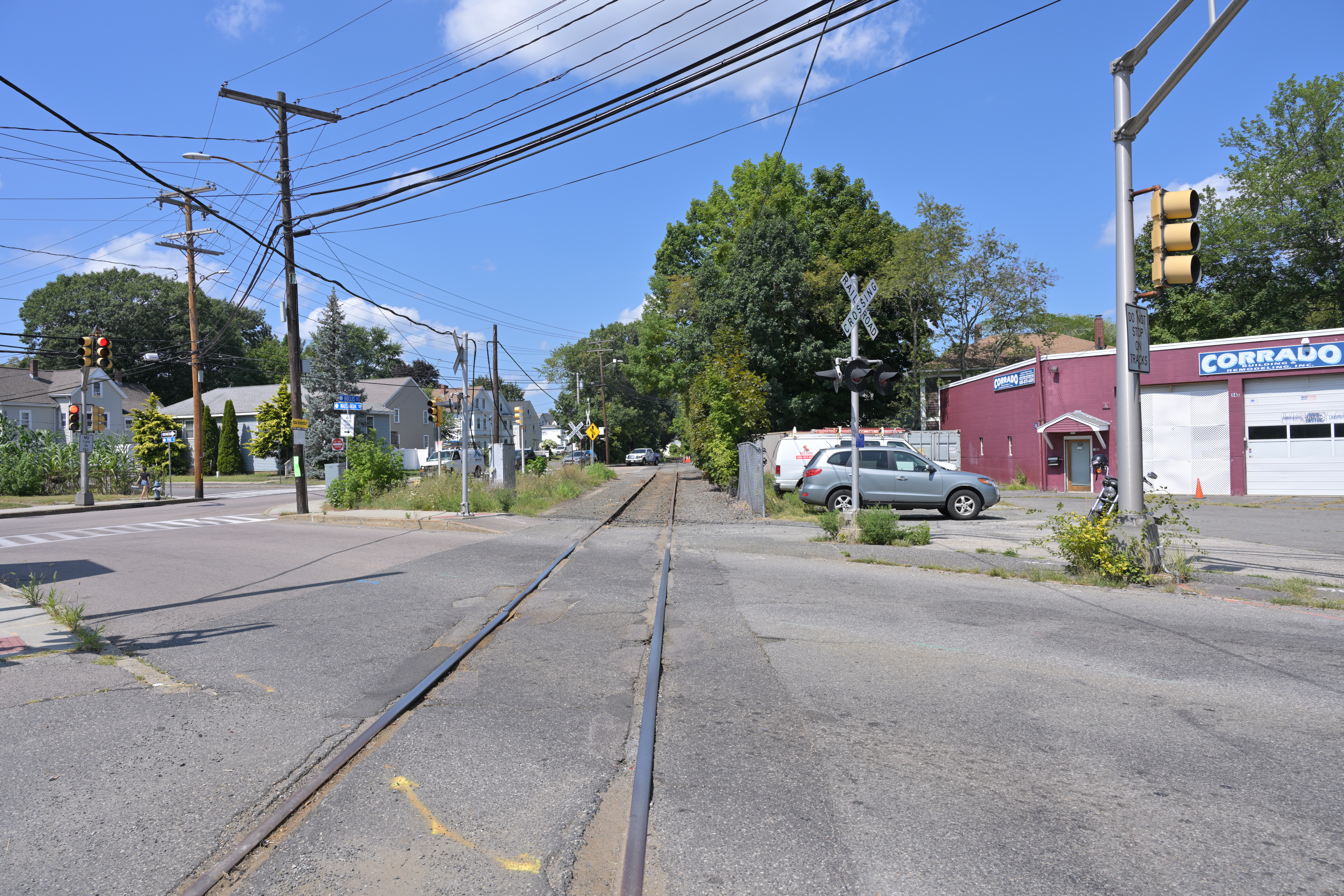
Active tracks in Framingham in 2025

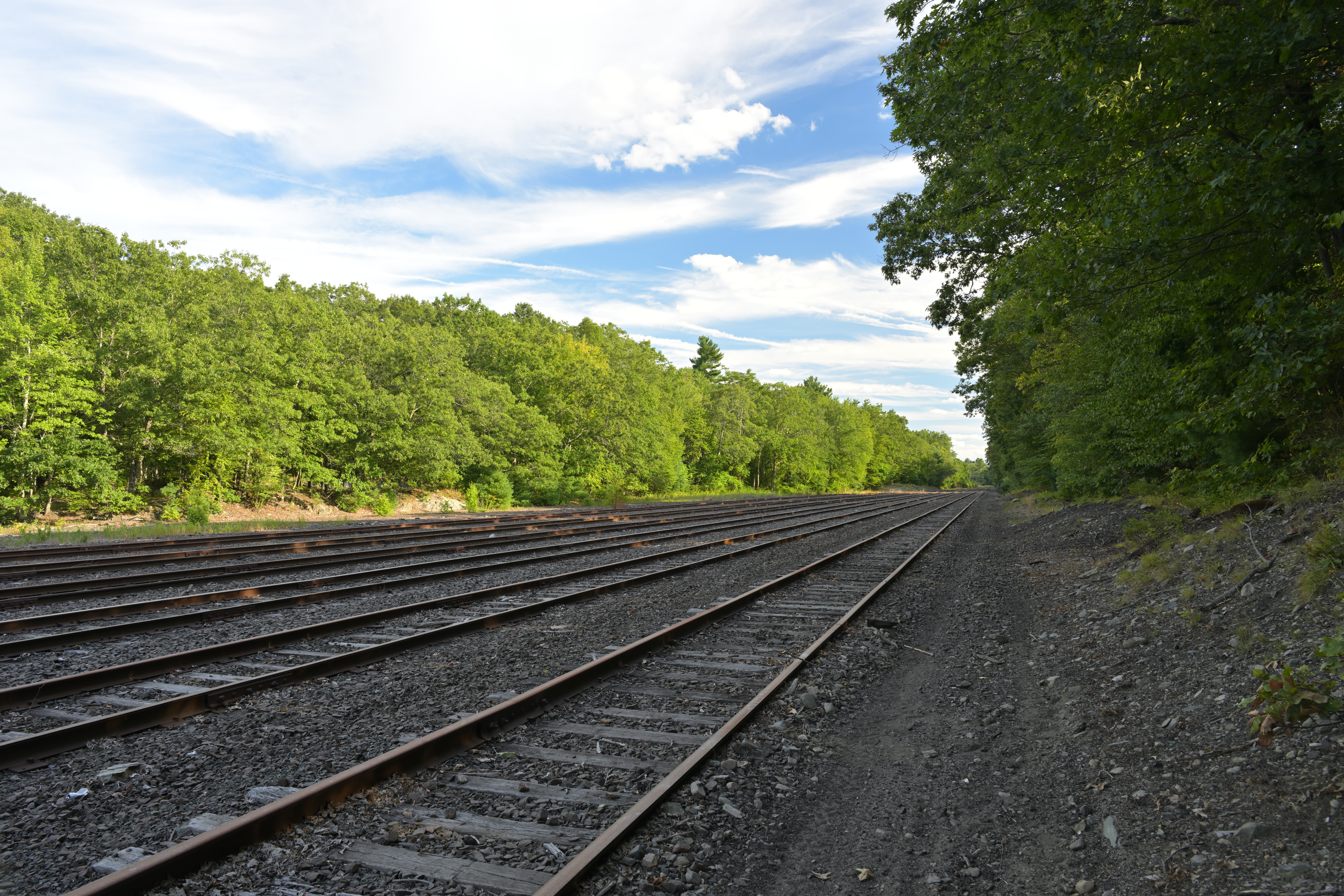
The CP Yard in Framingham in 2025

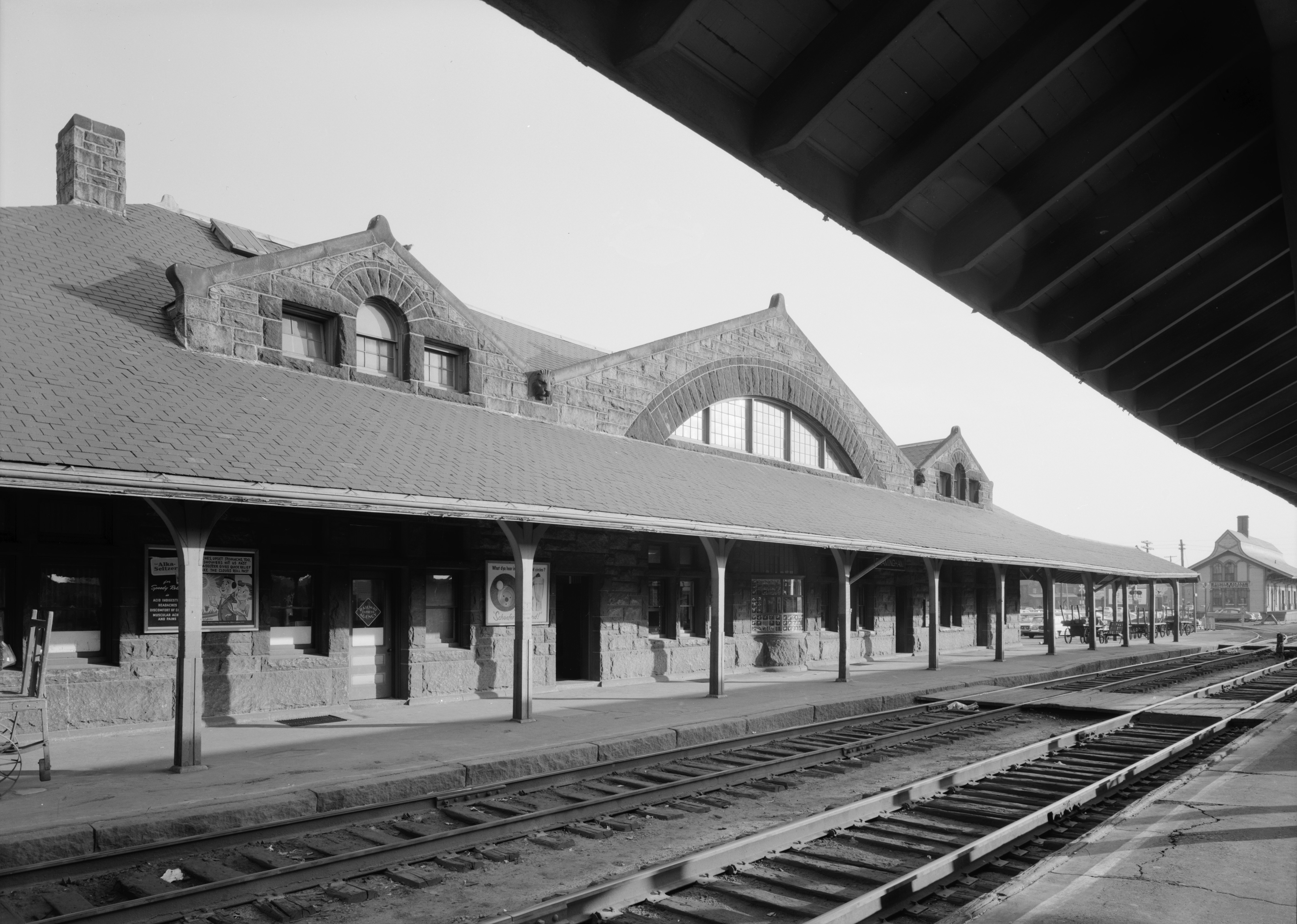
Framingham station in 1959
