= Newton Lower Falls Branch =

Former railway line in Massachusetts, US

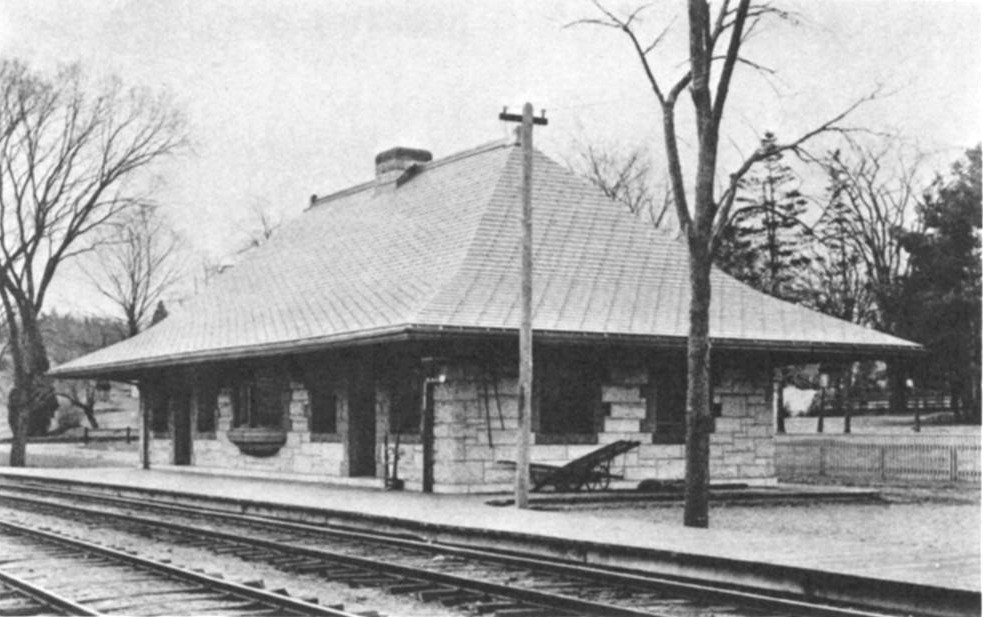
- Newton Lower Falls station in the 1890s

Overview
- Status: Closed
- Locale: Massachusetts
- Termini: Riverside; Newton Lower Falls
- Stations: 3

Service
- System: Boston and Albany Railroad

History
- Opened: January 18, 1847
- Electric service began: January 20, 1904
- Electric service ended: April 27, 1930
- Passenger service ended: August 1957
- Closed: May 30, 1972

Technical
- Line length: 1.2 (Note: The B&W listed the line as 1.251 miles (2.013 km) in 1852. B&A timetables gave the Riverside–Lower Falls distance as 1.10 miles (1.77 km) in 1899, 1.16 miles (1.87 km) in 1926, and 1.25 miles (2.01 km) in 1949. Other sources give various lengths in this range.) mi (1.9 km)
- Number of tracks: 1
- Track gauge: 4 ft 8 1/2 in (1,435 mm) standard gauge
- Electrification: Overhead lines (1904–1930)

The Newton Lower Falls Branch was a short branch of the Boston and Albany Railroad in Massachusetts, United States. The approximately 1.2-mile (1.9 km) line ran between Riverside station in Newton and Lower Falls in Wellesley, with one intermediate station.

The branch opened in January 1847 and immediately saw commuter service. After the Highland branch opened in 1886, the Newton Lower Falls Branch was relegated to shuttle service. A streetcar-like electric railcar powered by overhead lines provided all passenger service on the branch from January 1904 to April 1930. The northern half of the branch was relocated in 1926. Passenger service dropped from 20 daily round trips in 1904 to just one in 1950; it ended entirely in 1957.

Freight service continued until 1972. Ownership was transferred to the state in two segments in 1973 and 1982. Proposals in the early 21st century to convert the alignment to a rail trail resulted in a decade of litigation, which concluded that the line had never been formally abandoned. One section of rail trail opened in 2012; another portion is planned.

== Route ==
Map of the Newton Lower Falls Branch with the pre-1926 alignment in red

The approximately 1.2-mile (1.9 km) line originally branched off the Boston and Albany main line west of Riverside station on the Weston side of the Charles River. The single track ran south, crossing the Charles into the Lower Falls section of Newton, with Pine Grove station located at Pine Grove Avenue. The line crossed the Charles River again into the Lower Falls section of Wellesley, where the Newton Lower Falls station was located just north of Washington Street. (Note: Prior to 1887, the station was located south of Washington Street.) Tracks continued across the street to a freight yard and engine house. After 1926, the line branched off the Highland branch south of Riverside and ran southwest, joining the original alignment at Pine Grove. Passenger trains typically covered the length of the branch in five minutes.

== History ==
=== Early history ===
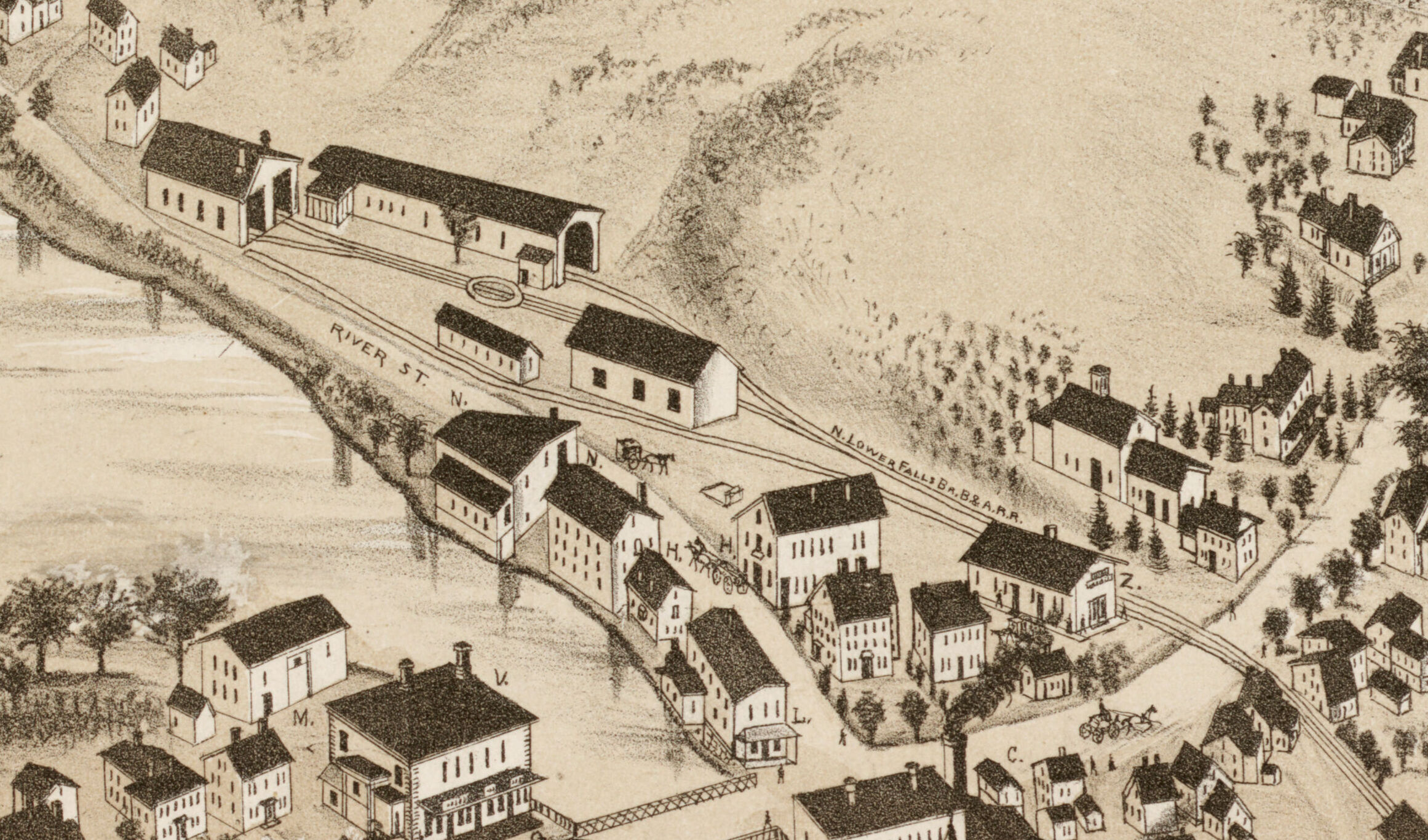
1880 illustration of the Newton Lower Falls terminus

The Boston and Worcester Railroad opened through northern Newton in 1834. It was originally planned to go through Lower Falls, but opposition from residents led it to be built to the north instead. Around 1845, the inhabitants of Newton Lower Falls and Newton Upper Falls requested that the B&W extend a branch to the two villages. The railroad was amenable to the proposal and ordered a survey. By 1846, the railroad approved plans to build a branch to Lower Falls.

The Newton Lower Falls Branch opened on January 18, 1847. "Newton Special" commuter service was extended from West Newton to Lower Falls. The branch cost $39,050 to build. In 1848, it carried 26,381 passengers, most of them traveling between Lower Falls and Boston. By 1850, the branch was served by five daily round trips. Pine Grove station opened by 1856. Riverside station opened near the junction point with the main line around 1860.

The Boston and Worcester Railroad merged into the Boston and Albany Railroad (B&A) in 1867. On May 16, 1886, the B&A opened its Highland branch, which also connected to the main line near Riverside. Highland branch and main line commuter service were linked into the "Newton Circuit", while Lower Falls Branch service was reduced to shuttle trains operating between Riverside and Lower Falls. By the turn of the century, the shuttle ran 20 daily round trips (seven on Sundays). The B&A was acquired by the New York Central Railroad (NYC) in 1900, but maintained its separate identity.

Between 1881 and 1894, the B&A replaced 32 of its stations with Richardsonian Romanesque structures designed by H. H. Richardson and his successors Shepley, Rutan and Coolidge. The new Newton Lower Falls station was built in 1887; later demolished, it was very similar to the still-extant Ashland station. Riverside station was replaced in 1893–94. Both Riverside and Newton Lower Falls were designed by Shepley, Rutan and Coolidge. Pine Grove station was not replaced; it remained a small wooden shelter.

The B&A eliminated grade crossings on its mainline in Newton in 1895–97. The city then began planning to eliminate the remaining grade crossings on the Newton Lower Falls Branch, the Highland branch, and the Charles River Branch within its borders. An 1898 city plan called for Pine Grove Avenue and Concord Street to be placed on bridges above the Newton Lower Falls Branch. The Highland branch crossings were eliminated in 1905–07, but those on the Newton Lower Falls Branch remained.

=== Electrification ===
The B&A tested a self-propelled steam railcar on the line in 1902 in an effort to recapture passengers from competing streetcar lines, but it was not found to be satisfactory. The B&A ended Sunday service on the line around the end of that year. In May 1903, residents appeared before the Massachusetts Railroad Commission to voice issues about the Lower Falls Branch. Their complaints included the lack of Sunday service, long waits at Riverside for connecting trains, the downgrading of Pine Grove station to a flag stop, and poor freight service.

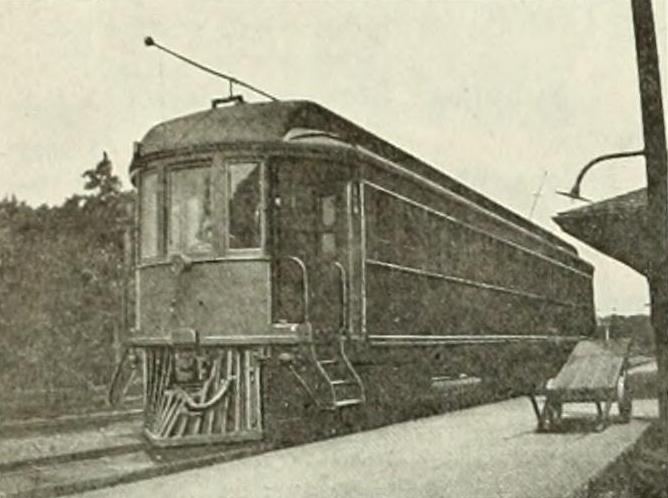
The electric car at Riverside in the 1900s

At that time, the B&A was studying third rail electrification of the Lower Falls Branch and the Newton Circuit, though it did not plan to construct it for at least several years. In June 1903, the commission ruled that the B&A was not required to operate Sunday service on the line. However, it did require the railroad to resume using a fireman on locomotives on the branch; the practice of only having an engineer was considered unsafe. The B&A also resolved the transfer delays at Riverside. In September 1903, the railroad announced that it would electrify the Newton Lower Falls Branch with overhead lines in the following months. The electrification was intended to reduce the cost of running the shuttle trains.

Testing of the electrification took place on January 19, 1904. A single electric railcar replaced the shuttle trains the next day, operating on the same schedule. (Note: Several sources incorrectly claim that electric service began on February 1, 1900.) The electrification resembled that of suburban streetcar lines, with a single wire strung from lineside poles. Power was purchased from the Boston Suburban Electric Company – a holding firm for several streetcar lines that eventually were merged as the Middlesex and Boston Street Railway (M&B) – with electricity supplied from its Newton power station. The company's Newton–Framingham streetcar line on Washington Street, then part of the Newton Street Railway, crossed the line at Lower Falls. The southern track of the four-track B&A mainline was electrified for the short distance between the branch junction and Riverside station.

All service on the line was provided by the single electric car, originally numbered 11 and later 01, which was built in the company's Allston shops. The car resembled a typical interurban car save for the pilot on each end. It was a 60 feet (18 m) long combination car with a 40-passenger coach section, a small central baggage section, and a 20-passenger smoking section. Propulsion was a pair of 125 horsepower (93 kW) electric motors. It was equipped with a dead man's switch – a "novel device" at the time. The car was locally known as the "Ping-Pong".

In 1913, the B&A tested an Edison-Beach storage battery railcar on the branch, as the NYC was considering purchase of a fleet of the cars for lightly used branch lines. However, the "Ping-Pong" remained the sole passenger car on the branch after the test. Service on the line was reduced during World War I and was down to 15 daily round trips by 1926. In February 1926, the state legislature approved plans for the B&A and the Metropolitan District Commission to swap land near Riverside. This allowed the B&A to relocate the northern half of the line to remove tracks from parkland and to avoid replacing the Charles River bridge. The relocation took place later in 1926, leaving the Lower Falls Branch connected to the Highland branch south of Riverside.

=== Closure ===
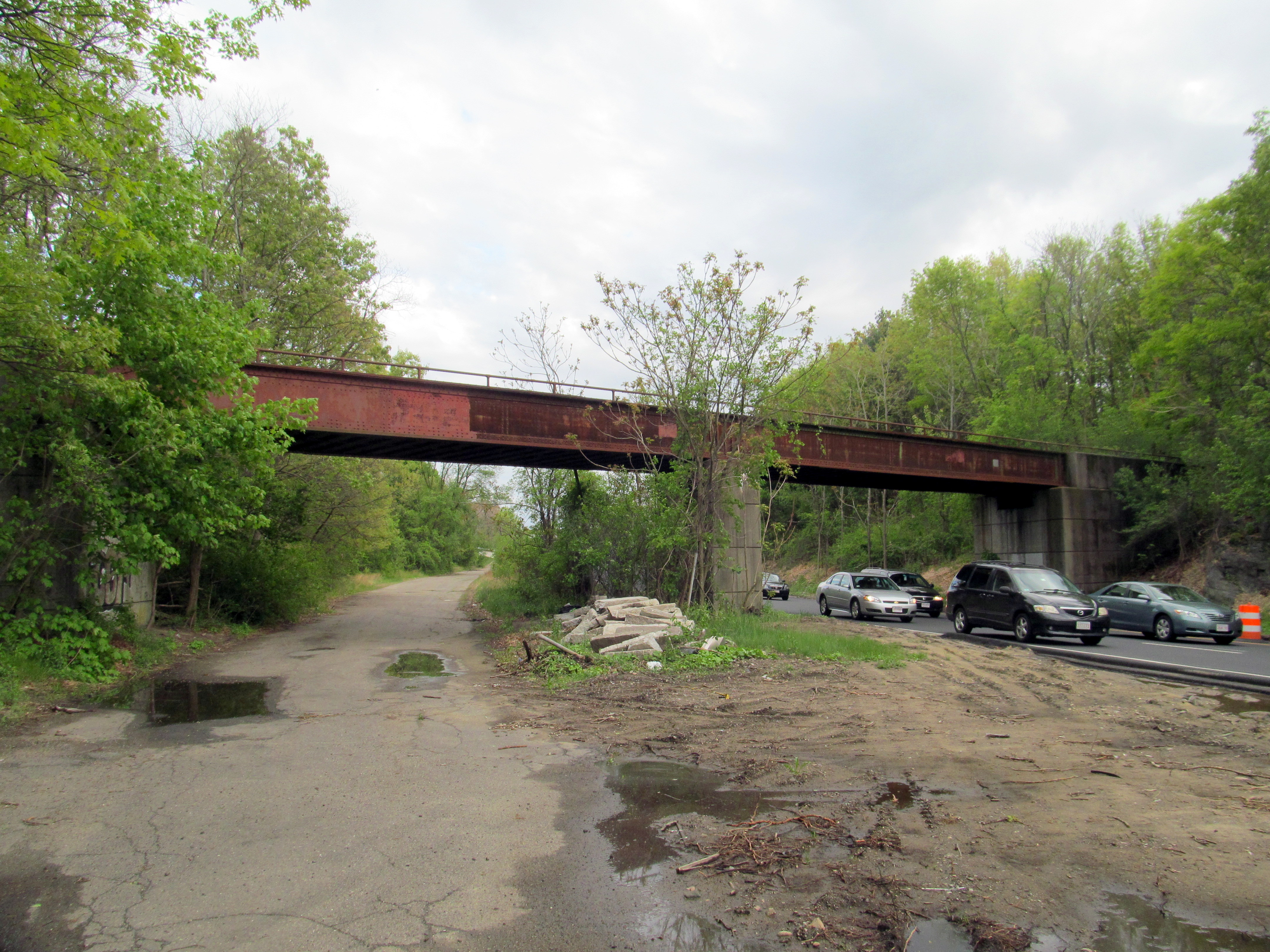
The 1951-opened bridge over the Route 128 ramp seen in 2012

The M&B replaced its Newton–Framingham streetcar line with buses in late 1929. Its final streetcar service, the Auburndale–Lake Street line, was replaced with buses around April 1, 1930. With power no longer readily available, the B&A switched the line back to steam operation on April 27, 1930. Service was reduced to 7 1/2 daily round trips at that time. It was further reduced to four daily round trips – two in the morning peak and two in the afternoon peak – by 1934. Saturday service ended in the 1940s; by 1949, Pine Grove was only served on peak-direction trips. Lower Falls station was demolished in 1944; Pine Grove and Riverside stations are also no longer extant.

On January 9, 1950, all passenger service on the branch was suspended due to a coal shortage during a miner's strike. After a petition from residents, a single round trip for commuters was restored on February 6. Diesel locomotives – typically hauling a single coach – replaced steam locomotives on the branch in April 1951. The state constructed the northern section of the Circumferential Highway (Route 128) in 1950–51. The highway crossed under the Newton Lower Falls Branch between Pine Grove and Riverside, with a bridge built to carry the rail line above the highway. Route 128 was relocated slightly to the west in the early 1960s during the construction of the Massachusetts Turnpike extension to Boston. A new bridge for the Newton Lower Falls Branch was constructed over the new alignment, while the old alignment became an interchange ramp.

In February 1957, the B&A petitioned the state Public Utilities Commission for permission to discontinue passenger service on the Newton Lower Falls Branch. The commission approved the petition that July, citing "meager patronage" and the availability of other nearby stations. Passenger service on the branch ended in August 1957, though freight service continued. The Highland branch was abandoned in mid-1958 for conversion into a streetcar line (now the Green Line D branch). The short section at Riverside connecting the Newton Lower Falls Branch with the mainline was kept in service. The B&A was fully merged into the NYC in 1961. The NYC in turn merged into Penn Central in 1968.

Freight service to the final customer on the Lower Falls Branch, a lumber yard in Wellesley, ended on May 30, 1972. (Note: A short portion of the former Highland branch near Riverside remained in use for an industrial customer until 1976.) In January 1973, Penn Central sold most of its lines in eastern Massachusetts to the Massachusetts Bay Transportation Authority. This included the section of the Newton Lower Falls Branch north of the Route 128 bridge. In 1975, the United States Railway Association did not recommend that the branch be included in Conrail because of the lack of traffic on the line. Penn Central applied by 1975 to formally abandon the line; the company removed the rails on the branch in 1976, but formal abandonment did not actually occur. On November 1, 1982, Penn Central deeded the portion of the branch south of Route 128 to the Metropolitan District Commission. It included a deed restriction that disallowed the right-of-way from being used as "a transportation, communication, electrical or other corridor or right of way".

=== Rail trail and litigation ===
A 1996 state study of the MetroWest region identified several disused rail lines, including the Newton Lower Falls Branch, as potential rail trails. Planning for rehabilitation of the Charles River bridge between Newton and Wellesley for trail use began in 2003. The trail proposal proved controversial in Newton Lower Falls – particularly the segment between Concord Street and Pine Grove Avenue, where the right-of-way is between residential properties. Trail supporters saw it as an opportunity to reconnect the neighborhood with the rest of Newton, which it is separated from by Route 128; opponents claimed it would further divide the neighborhood. Among the supporters was state representative Kay Khan, whose property abutted the right-of-way. Trail opponents dumped yard waste and trash on the disputed segment to prevent it from being used as an unofficial trail.

A 2006 lawsuit filed by abutters against the Massachusetts Department of Conservation and Recreation (DCR) – the successor to the Metropolitan District Commission – alleged that the 1982 deed restriction prevented DCR from using the alignment for a trail. DCR argued that the restriction was intended to be a noncompete clause preventing railroad use of the alignment and did not preclude a trail. A second suit on similar grounds was filed in 2009. It was ultimately dismissed in 2015, as the 30-year deed restriction had expired in 2012.

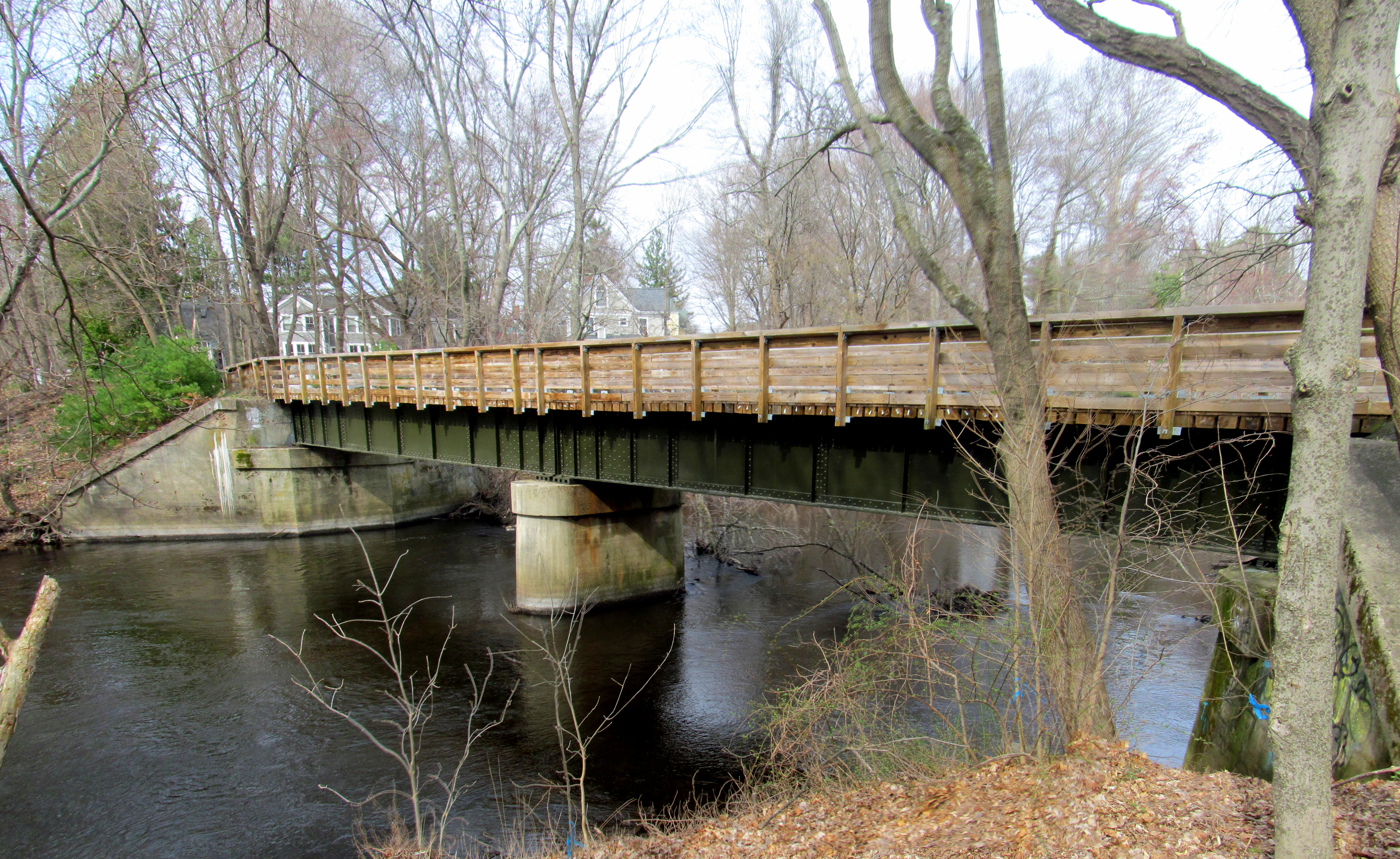
The repaired bridge carrying the rail trail

Additional lawsuits were filed in 2011 and 2014 by other abutters claiming that the rail easement had reverted to the adjacent property owners upon abandonment of the line. In 2014, the Massachusetts Land Court found in the latter case that the line had never actually been abandoned under Massachusetts state law, and that whether the line had been abandoned was a federal issue. The Massachusetts Supreme Judicial Court affirmed in 2016, and the 2011 case was also dismissed for that reason. In 2017, the United States District Court for the District of Massachusetts dismissed a further suit by the 2014 plaintiffs, finding that the federal Surface Transportation Board (STB) had sole jurisdiction over railroad abandonments. At the request of the court, the STB filed an amicus curiae brief agreeing that it had sole jurisdiction and that the line had not been abandoned.

In response to the controversy, a neighborhood working group was formed in 2009. The group identified 24 potential trail segments – some on streets, some on the railbed, and some on other alignments – that could be connected in various combinations to form a usable trail. The DCR proceeded with the southern portion of the rail trail, between Concord Street and Washington Street, which did not abut residential properties. It allocated state funds for reconstruction of three footbridges over the Charles River, including the 1910-built former railroad bridge, in 2009. Construction took place from late 2010 to May 2011. The bridge and the trail portion opened in May 2012.

In 2017, the DCR awarded a grant to a coalition of local nonprofit organizations for a study of the Two Bridges Trail. That short trail would cross the disused rail bridges over I-95 and the interchange ramp, connecting to Clearwater Road and the Riverside station parking lot. In November 2020, the DCR released a study of potential trail alignments through the Lower Falls area between the Two Bridges Trail and Quinobequin Road. The preferred alignment would use the railbed between Route 128 and Pine Grove Avenue, and DCR land adjacent to a golf course between Pine Grove Avenue and Concord Street. Those two segments were estimated to cost $2 million and $3 million to construct. The disputed section of railbed between Pine Grove Avenue and Concord Street was not considered in the study due to the litigation.
