= Athol Junction =

Coordinates: 42°7′53.64″N 72°33′31.23″W

Athol Junction is a place in Springfield, Massachusetts, named after the rail line that split off to Athol, Massachusetts, before The Quabbin Reservoir was flooded. It is located next to I-291 and the tracks now are used for the industrial park and extend to Indian Orchard before stopping. When the line was active the tracks extended over the Chicopee River, into Ludlow, Massachusetts, and on to Athol.

The Athol and Enfield Railroad and the Springfield and North-Eastern Railroad were chartered in 1869, and succeeded by the Springfield, Athol and Northeastern Railroad in 1872, opening in 1873 as a branch from Athol Junction in Springfield to the Vermont and Massachusetts Railroad in Athol. The B&A bought the line in 1880. The majority of the line was closed in the 1930s due to the formation of the Quabbin Reservoir.
