= Lake Shore Limited (New York Central Railroad train) =

American named passenger train (1897–1956)

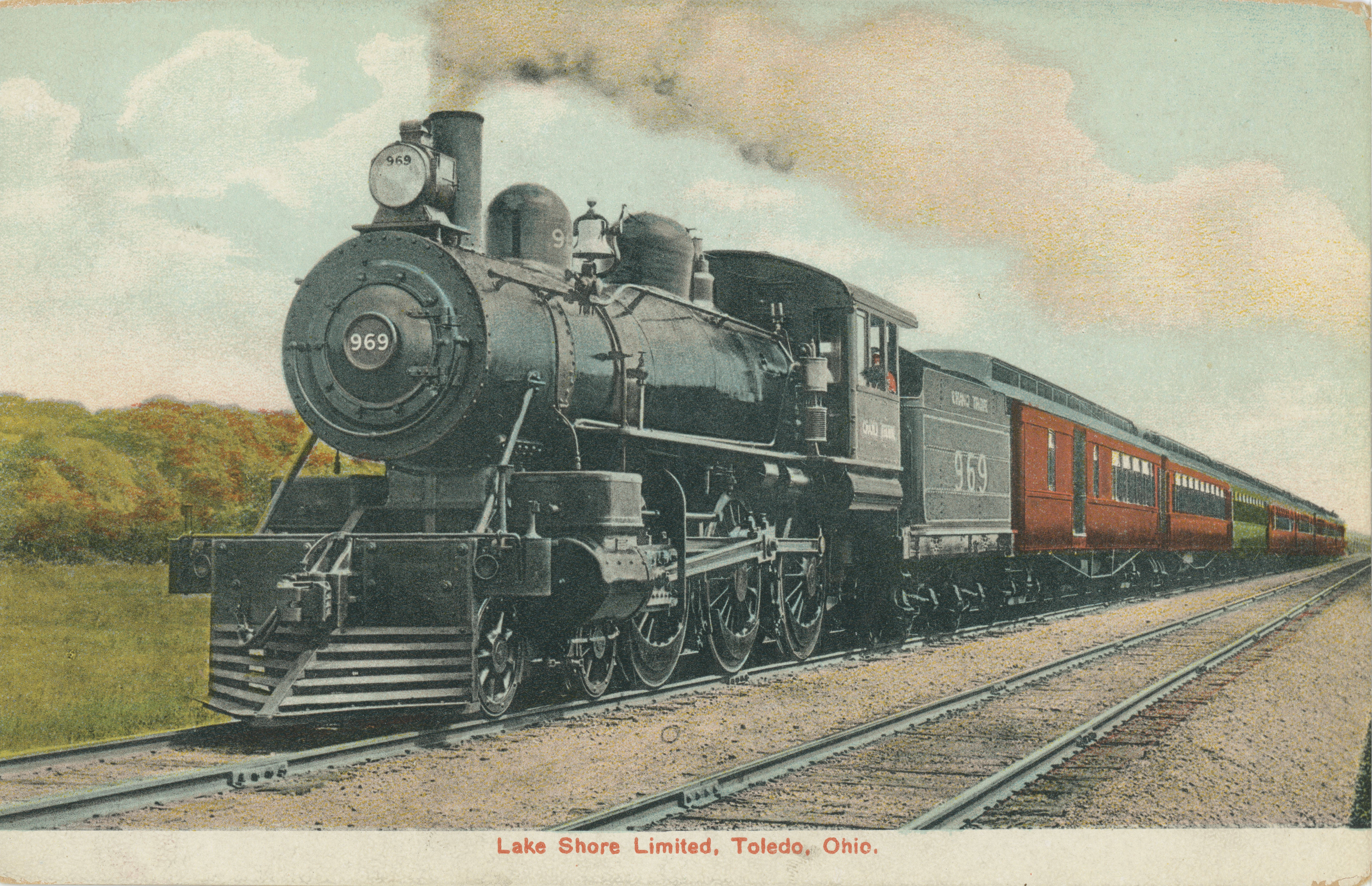
- The Lake Shore Limited depicted on a postcard.

Overview
- Service type: Inter-city rail
- Status: Discontinued
- Locale: Northeastern United States
- First service: 1897
- Last service: October 28, 1956
- Former operator: New York Central Railroad

Route
- Termini: New York City and Boston; Chicago
- Distance travelled: 961.2 miles (1,546.9 km) (New York - Chicago)
- Service frequency: Daily
- Train numbers: Westbound: 19; Eastbound: 22

Technical
- Track gauge: 4 ft 8 1/2 in (1,435 mm)

The Lake Shore Limited was a passenger train service operated by the New York Central Railroad between New York City and Chicago, Illinois, from 1897 to 1956. Separate sections linked to Boston and St. Louis. The Lake Shore Limited was the New York Central's first luxury passenger train, and paved the way for its more famous cousin the 20th Century Limited. The 1897 name is now used by Amtrak's Lake Shore Limited, which follows much of the same route.

== History ==
The Lake Shore Limited's immediate predecessor was the Exposition Flyer (not to be confused with a train of the same name operated between Chicago & Oakland, California, between 1939 and 1949), which the New York Central operated between New York and Chicago during the 1893 World's Columbian Exposition, held in Chicago.

The Lake Shore Limited began on May 30, 1897, with an advertised 24-hour schedule from New York to Chicago. A Boston section which connected at Albany, New York had a 26-hour schedule. The Lake Shore Limited's chief competitor was the Pennsylvania Railroad's Pennsylvania Limited, which began in 1887. The Lake Shore Limited carried the train numbers 19 (westbound) and 22 (eastbound).

The New York Central truncated the westbound Lake Shore Limited to Buffalo on July 15, 1956, and substituted the Great Lakes Aerotrain over the Chicago-Cleveland portion of the route. The eastbound Lake Shore Limited ended on October 28, 1956, as part of a system-wide reorganization.

== Route and equipment used ==
Sample consist
September 1954 Official Guide of the Railways
- Train: Westbound
- Lounge sleeper (New York—Chicago); 10-6 sleeper (New York—Chicago; carried through to San Francisco, California on the California Zephyr); 14 section sleeper (New York—Chicago); 10-6 sleeper (New York—Chicago); 10-6 sleeper (New York—Toledo, Ohio); 22 roomette sleeper (Boston—Chicago; interchanged in Buffalo with the New England Wolverine); 17 roomette sleeper (Toronto—Cleveland; interchanged in Buffalo with The Ontarian); 10-6 sleeper (Charlottesville, Virginia—Chicago; interchanged in Toledo with the C&O's No. 47); Dining car; Coaches (New York—Chicago)

The original Lake Shore Limited was the last New York Central train featuring Wagner Palace Car Company equipment before the latter's merger with the Pullman Car Company in 1899. The original consist was as follows: buffet/library/smoking car, parlor car, dining car, three sleepers and an observation lounge. Electric power came from a dynamo in the baggage car.

The westbound Lake Shore Limited originated at Grand Central Station in New York and traveled along the Hudson River to Albany, where it joined with a section from Boston. From there it traveled west to Rochester, New York, then southwest to Buffalo, New York. From Buffalo it ran over the tracks of the Lake Shore & Michigan Southern Railway (LS&MS) through Cleveland, Ohio, to Chicago's LaSalle Street Station. Another section separated at Cleveland and ran over the Cleveland, Cincinnati, Chicago and St. Louis Railway to Cincinnati, Ohio, and St. Louis, Missouri.

== 1940 crash ==
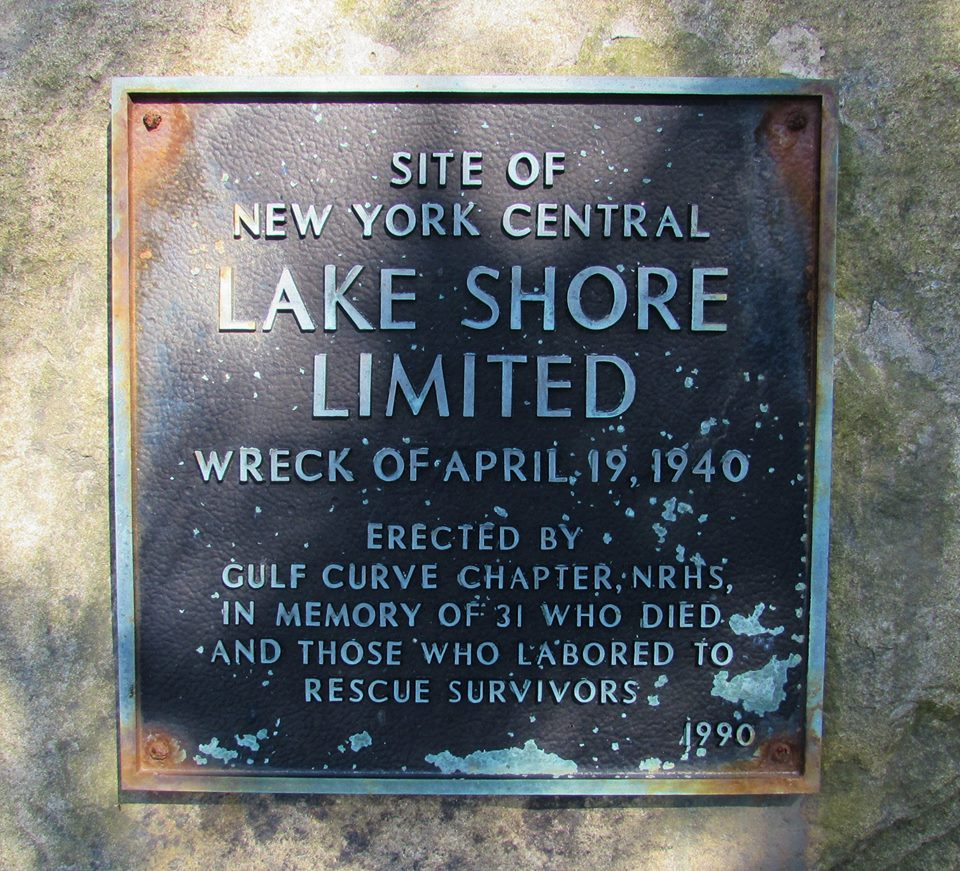
Memorial plaque for 1940 derailment in Little Falls, New York.

On April 19, 1940 the westbound Lake Shore Limited derailed due to excessive speed on a curve killing 31 and injuring nearly 140. The train had left Albany 21 minutes behind schedule and the engineer was trying to make up time.

== Legacy ==
Before the coming of the 20th Century Limited, the Lake Shore Limited was the New York Central's premier long-distance train. Amtrak now operates the Lake Shore Limited between Chicago and New York, with a Boston section, over the same route. Amtrak's Lake Shore Limited operates a 20½-hour schedule to New York and a 23-hour schedule to Boston.
