= Niverville station =

Niverville
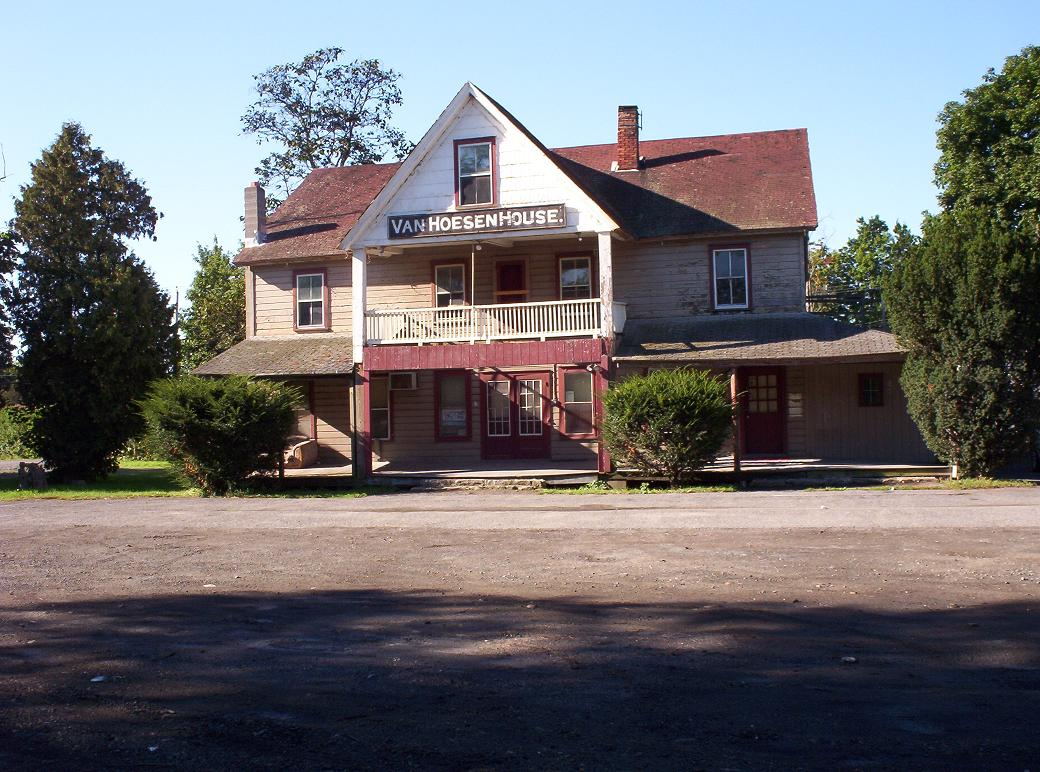
- The Van Hoesen House, a.k.a. Van Hoesen Station on the Boston & Albany Railroad as seen in 2005

General information
- Location: Niverville, New York
- Coordinates: 42.4414°N 73.6604°W
- Owner: private
- Lines: B&A Main Line

History
- Opened: 1840s
- Rebuilt: 1940s

Former services
Preceding station	New York Central Railroad	Following station
Rensselaer toward Albany	Boston and Albany Railroad Main Line	Post Road Crossing toward Boston
East Greenbush toward Albany	Boston and Albany Railroad Main Line	Chatham Center toward Boston
Location

Niverville station is a former Boston and Albany Railroad station in the town of Schodack, New York, hamlet of Van Hoesen, New York.

The station itself was built in the 1840s by the Western Railroad of Massachusetts and became part of the Boston and Albany Railroad in 1870. Regular service to this station tapered off in the late 1940s, but timetables list scheduled service through 1959. The building presently has 3 apartments upstairs and a tavern on the ground floor. The station is currently known as the Niverville Pub.
