= Springfield, Athol and North-eastern Railroad =

Map

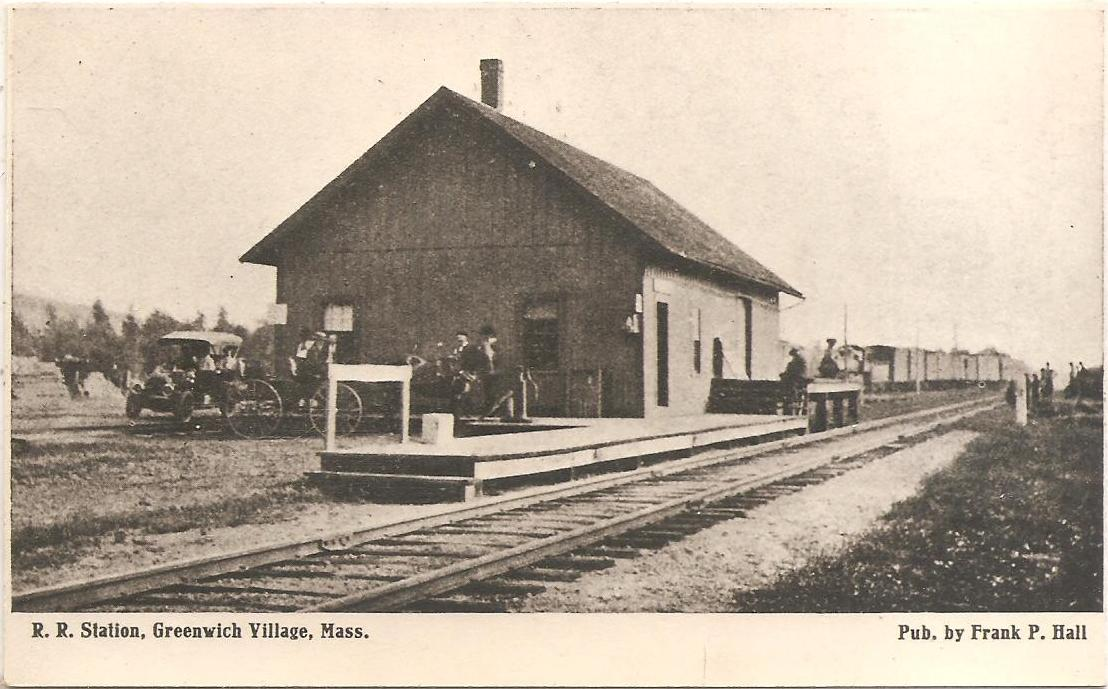
Greenwich Village, one of the Athol Branch stations closed in the 1930s during the creation of the Quabbin Reservoir

The Springfield, Athol and North–eastern Railroad was a railroad that operated in the northeast United States in the 19th and early 20th centuries. It was also referred to as the Athol Branch, most commonly, or the Athol and Enfield Railroad.

== History ==
The Athol and Enfield Railroad was chartered in 1869, and succeeded by the Springfield, Athol and North-eastern Railroad in 1873, opening in 1873 as a branch from Athol Junction in Springfield to the Vermont and Massachusetts Railroad in Athol. The Boston and Albany Railroad bought the line in 1880. In 1900, the New York Central Railroad leased the B&A. The line was nicknamed "Rabbit Run" by engineers due to its stations being short distances apart, meaning the trains would have to hop between them like a rabbit. The line was never all that busy mostly due to its rural nature, but other railroad lines had already connected Springfield to Athol, making the line a bit redundant.

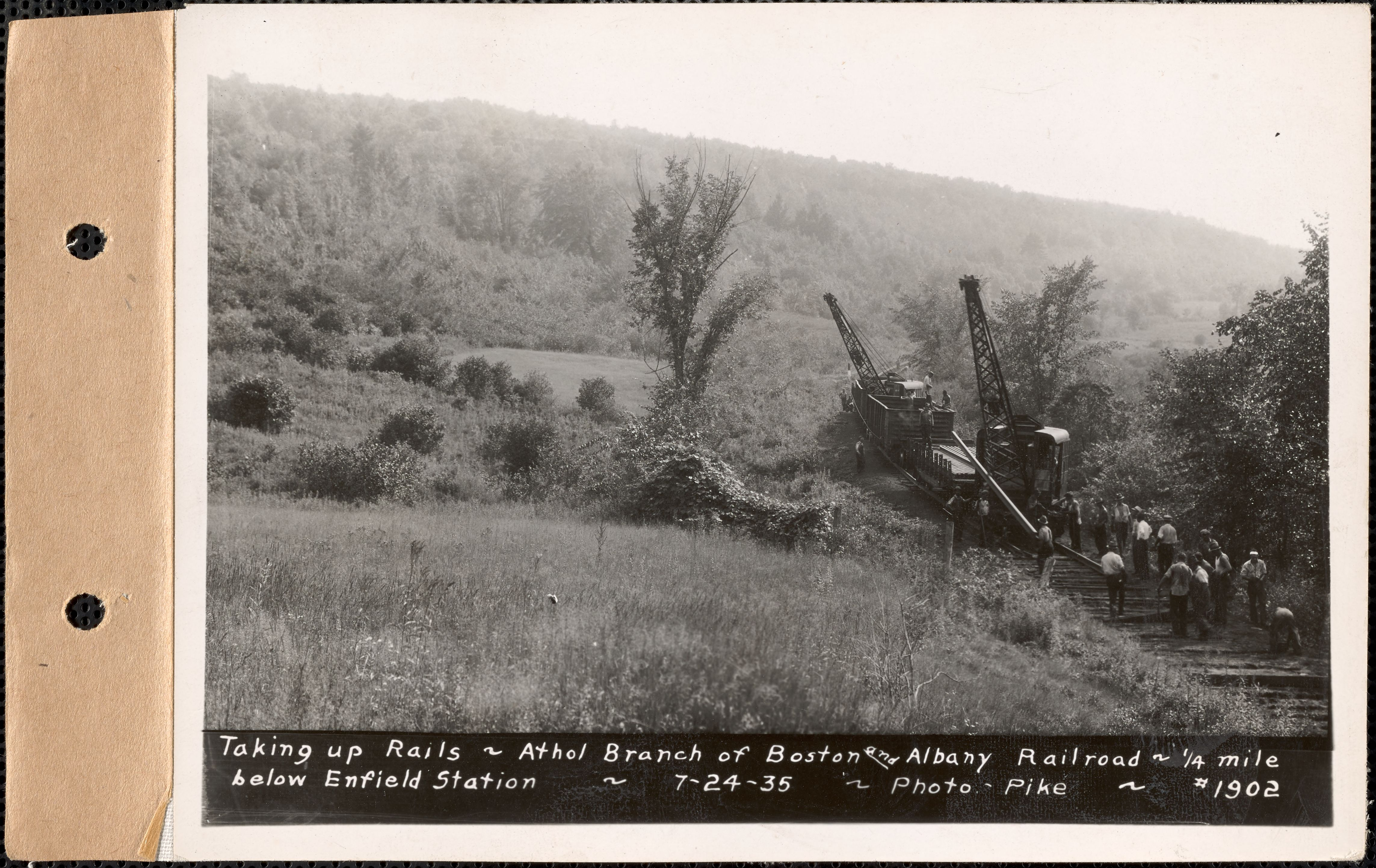
Removal of rails on the line, just south of Enfield Station, in July of 1934. The line would be cut back to Bondsville.

The majority of the line was closed in 1934 due to the formation of the Quabbin Reservoir. South of Bondsville operated after the truncation of the line but was closed by 1960.

=== Rabbit Run Trail ===
A 6.2-mile (10.0 km) rail trail, the Rabbit Run Trail, is planned for the remaining portion of right-of-way in Athol and New Salem. A portion of the Rabbit Run Trail also exists in Belchertown. A model of the line through the Quabbin towns is on display at the Swift River Valley Historical Society.

== Station Listing ==
Station Name	Milepost	City/Town	Images/Additional Information
Springfield Union Station (Massachusetts)	0.0	Springfield	Springfield Union Station as it looked in the 1920s. It was the junction with the Boston and Maine Railroad and the New Haven Railroad.
Athol Junction	2.2	Springfield	Junction with B&A Mainline
Fiberloid	5.5	Springfield	Named for Fiberloid Plastic Company
Indian Orchard	6.4	Springfield	
Ludlow	7.6	Ludlow	Station torn down in 1960
Collins	10.5	Ludlow	
Red Bridge	12.4	Ludlow	
Three Rivers	15.5	Palmer	The former right of way in Three Rivers in June of 2021.
Barrett's Junction	16.9	Palmer	Junction with Central Vermont Railway
Bondsville	18.4	Belchertown	The Central Massachusetts Railroad's trestle over the Swift River. The Athol Branch is visible to the left hand side.
West Ware	22.6	Ware	Bridge over Swift River at West Ware in February of 1931. The station was located north of here.
Enfield	26.8	Enfield	Enfield's passenger station in March of 1930, it was the only town in the valley to have separate passenger and freight depots.
Smith's Village	27.7	Enfield	Smith's Village station in March of 1930. The station was sometimes referred to as Smith's
Greenwich Lake*	29.0	Greenwich	
Greenwich Plains	29.9	Greenwich	Greenwich Plains station in May of 1930. The station was sometimes referred to as Greenwich.
Greenwich Village	31.7	Greenwich	Greenwich Village station in February of 1930, most stations in the Swift River Valley were built along the same plan as it.
Morgan Crossing	34.6	Greenwich	Morgan's Crossing in 1930. The station was a flag stop.
Soapstone	35.7	Dana	Named for a soapstone quarry located nearby
North Dana	37.0	Dana	North Dana Station in 1930.
New Salem	39.4	New Salem	A postcard of New Salem station circa 1905.
South Athol	42.5	Athol	A postcard of South Athol station in 1909. The building exists today as a private residence
Athol	47.6	Athol	Athol Union station in 1919. The terminus of the line and junction with Fitchburg mainline

*Not listed on Boston and Albany 1913 Timetable
