= Great Barrington station =

Great Barrington
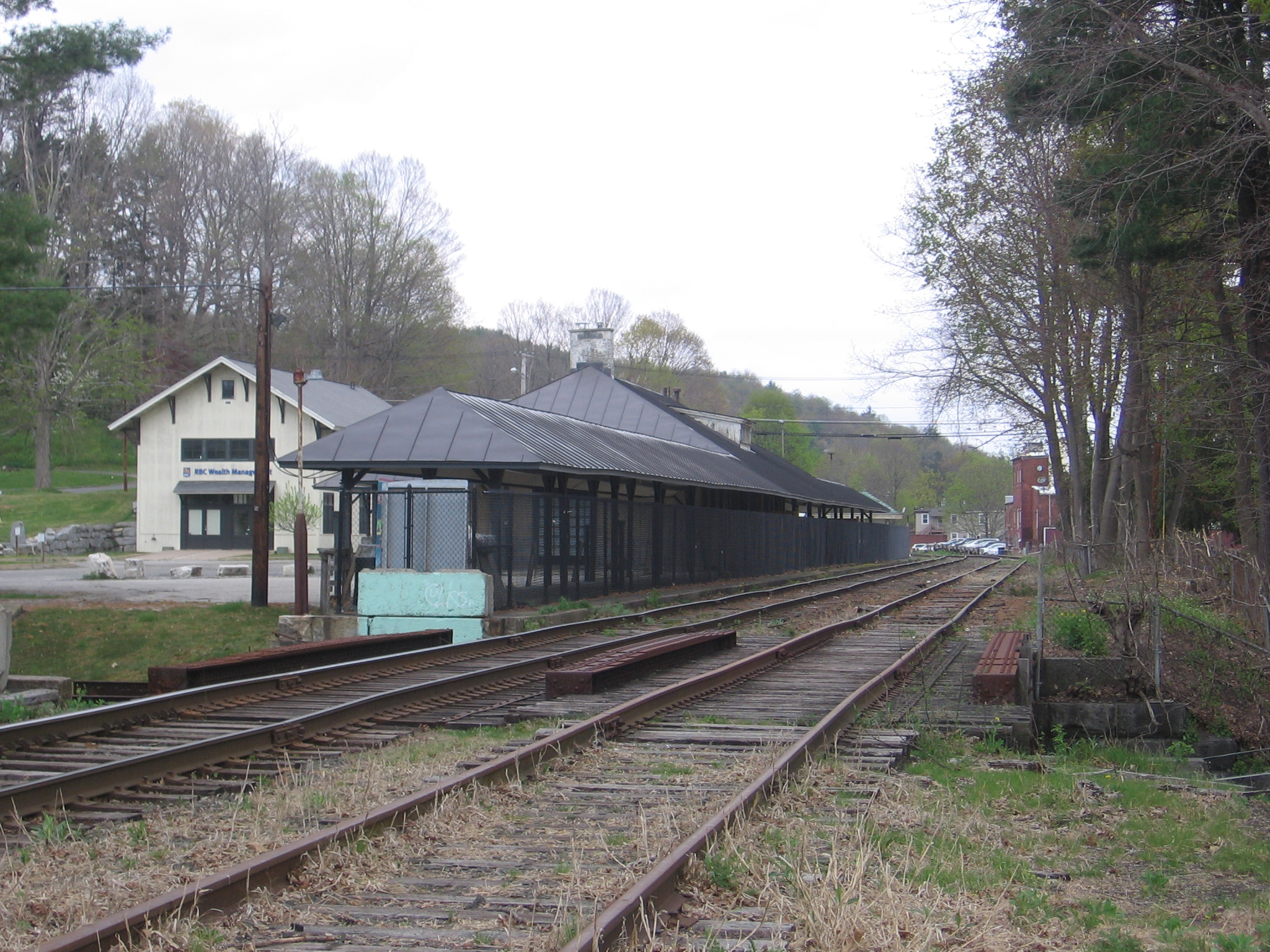

General information
- Location: Castle Street; Great Barrington, Massachusetts; United States
- Coordinates: 42°11′38″N 73°21′54″W
- Owner: Housatonic Railroad
- Line: Berkshire Line
- Platforms: 1 side platform
- Tracks: 2

History
- Opened: 1901
- Closed: 1971

Services
Preceding station	New York, New Haven and Hartford Railroad	Following station
Sheffield toward Norwalk and South Norwalk	Pittsfield Branch	Housatonic toward Pittsfield
- Great Barrington station
- U.S. Historic district – Contributing property
- Part of: Taconic and West Avenues Historic District (ID98000680)
Location

Great Barrington station is a former railroad station in Great Barrington, Massachusetts along the Housatonic Railroad Berkshire Line.

== History ==
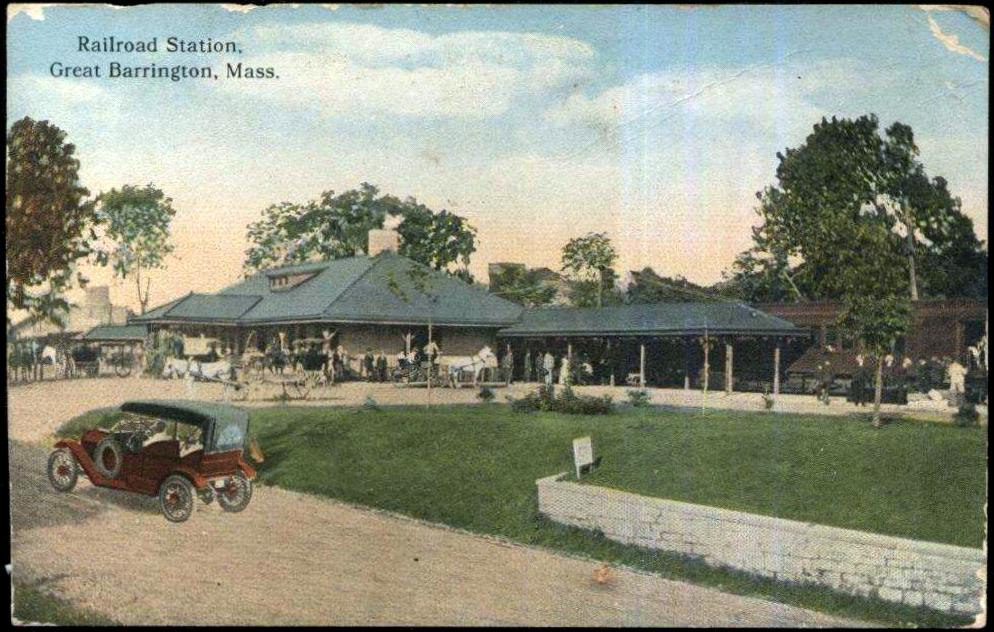
Early-20th-century postcard of the station

The railroad was chartered in 1836 and began placing rails in Bridgeport Connecticut and on the line from North Canaan, Connecticut in Great Barrington in September 1842. The station was built in 1901 to replace an earlier one on Railroad Avenue. The line ran north to Stockbridge, Lenox Railroad Station, Lee Station. In Pittsfield, it stopped at Pittsfield Depot, and later, at Union Station. Passenger service ended on April 30, 1971. It has been a stop on the Berkshire Scenic Railway. The station is a contributing property within the Taconic and West Avenues Historic District.

In 2008 the railroad began considering the possibility of resuming commercial passenger service along the entire line from the Danbury Branch to Pittsfield, and in May 2010 began a formal study of the same. At the time, the estimated cost of upgrading the railroad to support passenger trains was estimated to be between $100 million and $150 million, not including the cost of the required equipment. It decided it would not renew its agreement with Berkshire Scenic Railway Museum to continue operating passenger excursions over their railroad.

In July 2014, the Massachusetts Department of Transportation (MassDOT) authorized the purchase of 37 miles of the railroad's Berkshire Line from the Connecticut border in Sheffield through Great Barrington, Stockbridge, Lee, and Lenox to Pittsfield, where it joins the CSXT Railroad main line. MassDOT's purchase is intended to extend rail services to New York City via Southeast Station, following track improvements for passenger and freight service between Massachusetts and Connecticut.

== See also ==
- Mahaiwe Block
- National Register of Historic Places listings in Berkshire County, Massachusetts
