= Erie Lackawanna MU Cars =

Type of American electric multiple unit

Lackawanna MU
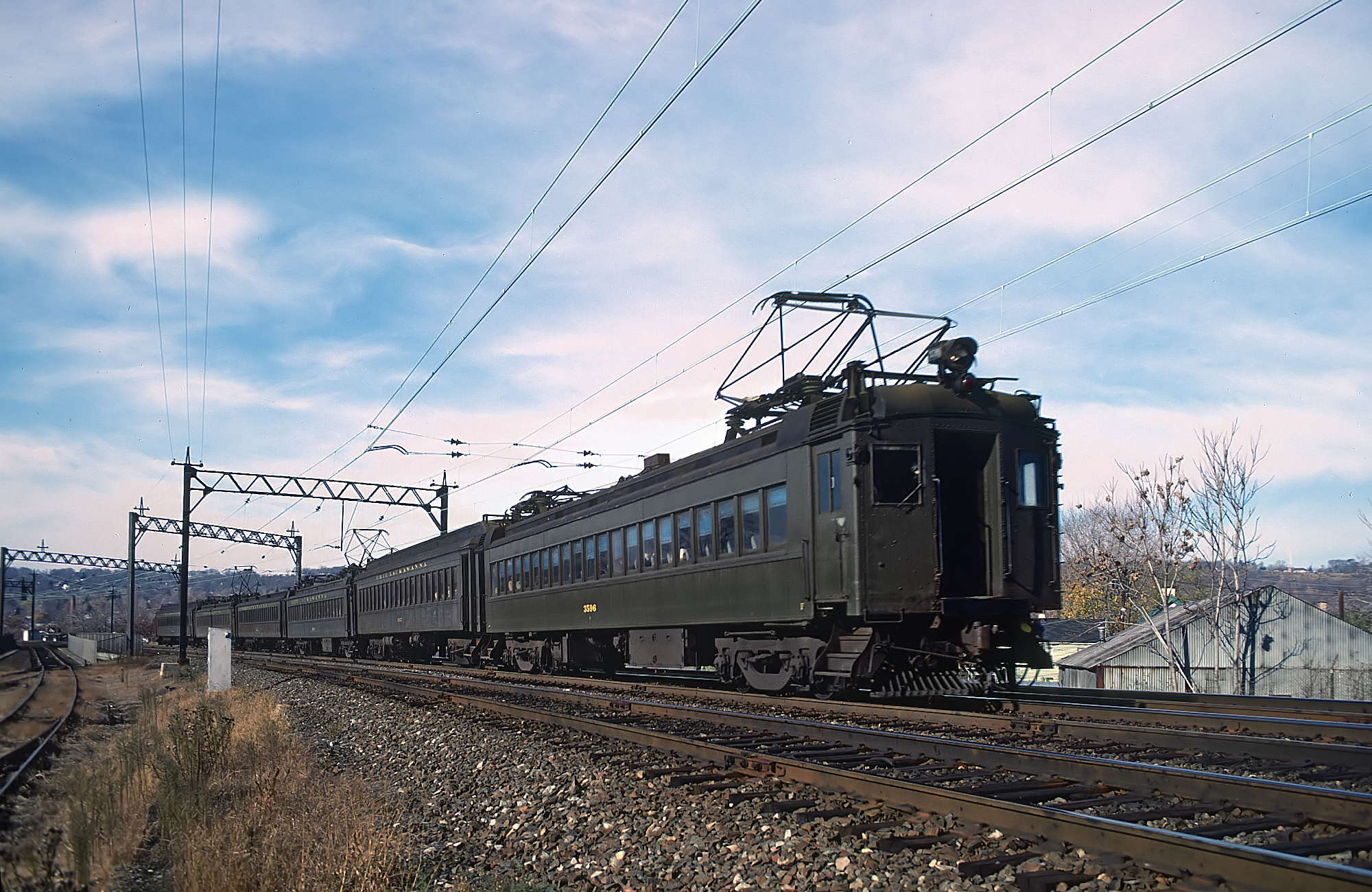
- Erie Lackawanna No. 3596 at Orange, New Jersey, in 1978
- In service: As MU: September 3, 1930–August 24, 1984
- Manufacturers: Pullman; GE; Bethlehem Steel; Barney and Smith
- Replaced: Steam-powered trains
- Constructed: Motor: 1929–1930; Low roof trailers: 1925; High roof trailers: 1912–1921
- Number built: Motor: 141; Coach trailers: 118; Combines: 18; Club trailers: 5
- Number preserved: 156 (97 trailers, 59 motors)
- Number scrapped: 127
- Formation: Motor-trailer pair
- Operators: Delaware, Lackawanna and Western, Erie Lackawanna, Conrail (under NJDOT), New Jersey Transit

Specifications
- Car body construction: carbon steel
- Car length: ≈70 ft 1 in (21.36 m)
- Width: 9 ft 11 1/2 in (3.035 m)
- Height: Motor: 12 ft 11 in (3.94 m); Low-roof trailers: 13 ft 0 in (3.96 m); High-roof trailers: 14 ft 3.75 in (4.3625 m),14 ft 6 in (4.42 m)
- Floor height: 4 ft 0 in (1.22 m)
- Doors: 2, end vestibule
- Maximum speed: 63 miles per hour (101 km/h) (level track); 75 miles per hour (121 km/h) (downgrades)
- Weight: Motor: 134,000 pounds (61,000 kg); Trailer: 109,500 pounds (49,700 kg)
- Prime mover: 4x255hp General Electric DC traction motors
- Power output: 1,020 hp (760 kW)
- Acceleration: 1.5 mph/s (0.67 m/s^{2})
- Deceleration: 1.75 mph/s (0.78 m/s^{2})
- HVAC: Electric heat, openable windows
- Electric systems: Overhead line, 3,000 V DC
- Current collection: Pantograph
- UIC classification: Bo'Bo'
- AAR wheel arrangement: B-B
- Braking system: Pneumatic
- Coupling system: AAR
- Track gauge: 4 ft 8 1/2 in (1,435 mm) standard gauge

The Erie Lackawanna MU Cars were a fleet of electric multiple unit commuter railcars used by the Delaware, Lackawanna and Western Railroad (D&LW) and successor railroads in the state of New Jersey. The D&LW undertook electrification of its Morristown Line and related branches in 1929–1930, and purchased 141 motor cars from Pullman to operate it. These were supplemented by 141 unpowered trailers of various types which were converted from existing rolling stock. The multiple units were successful and remained in service until 1984.

== History ==
The MUs were inaugurated with fanfare on September 3, 1930, when the aging inventor Thomas A. Edison, a key proponent of DC current (the source of electric power for the MUs), drove the first train for the first mile along its 13-mile trip from Hoboken to Montclair, New Jersey. The service was extended in phases to other towns that would have yards to store the trains: South Orange, Summit, Gladstone, Morristown and Dover. Plans to extend electrified service west, for freight service, possibly as far as Scranton, PA, were investigated by the Lackawanna. The plans were abandoned due to cost, particularly since the timing of the extension coincided with the arrival of the Great Depression. The MUs did travel beyond the electrified district on occasion, particularly after World War II when there was a shortage of rail cars available. Unpowered MUs, pulled by steam locomotives, travelled on the Sussex Branch to Branchville, New Jersey, for instance, during the immediate post-war timeframe.

Over the years, the distinctive Pullman green cars were considered to be extremely reliable. Thomas T. Taber, in his book on the DL&W, called the Lackawanna MUs "...probably the finest multiple unit electric cars ever constructed." Their reliability remained excellent into their fourth decade of service, but suffered during the final years of their 54-year tenure in service.

During their 54-year tenure, the cars were run by four different railroad companies: the Lackawanna Railroad (1930–1960); the Erie Lackawanna Railroad (1960–1976); Conrail (1976–1982); and finally, NJ Transit (1983–1984). The cars were retired after their final runs on August 24, 1984. The DC power distribution system was retired at that point and a 25 kV 60 Hz AC power distribution system, which had been installed and tested over the previous several years as part of the re-electrification project, was switched on. Arrow III MU cars, which continued to run to and from Hoboken, initially replaced the Lackawanna MUs. The introduction of Midtown Direct service to New York City in 1996, however, would prove problematic as the Northeast Corridor Line into Manhattan still used the original Pennsylvania Railroad 12,000 volt 25 hertz AC distribution system. Given that the Arrow III cars were not engineered to easily switch from one voltage to another, it was necessary for NJ Transit to acquire new locomotives, ALP-44s, to handle the new service.

== Description ==
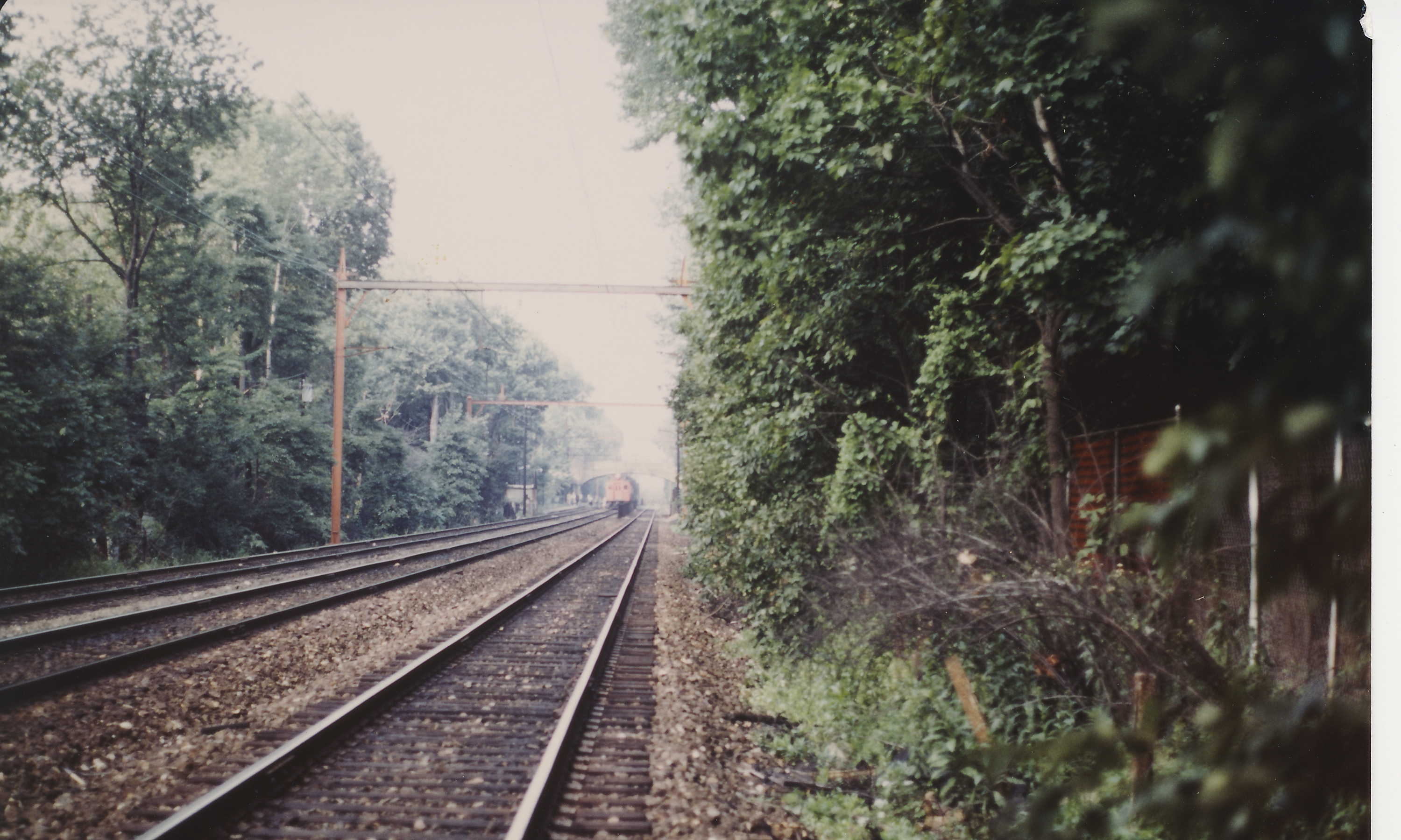
A westbound Lackawanna MU shown here stopping on the express track (Track 1) at Mountain Station in South Orange, New Jersey, in 1982. Note the repainted lead car which was part of a minor refurbishment carried out on some cars during the late 1970s and early 1980s due to delays in the re-electrification of the line.

The Lackawanna MUs were built from a combination of new motorized units (built by General Electric and Pullman) and converted coaches as trailers. These cars were semi-permanently attached to each other in pairs (trailer car-power car), with the trailer car on the westbound (Dover-facing) end of the train. Most of the trailer cars were built by Pullman. Typically, trains were limited to 6 pairs of these units, i.e. 12 cars. Although, due to the loss of a trailer car in a 1962 accident, its unmatched power car was placed into the middle of a 13-car train that was run during rush-hours only during the Erie Lackawanna years, the Tom Taber Express. New Jersey state law restricted the length of commuter trains to a maximum of 13 cars. Although with the unmatched power car in the pool of available cars, it was theoretically possible to have every combination of train length from two to 13 cars, the most common train lengths seen were 2 and 4 car trains off-peak and 6 and 8 cars during the rush hour. Three-car sets (two power cars plus a single coach) were used rarely, mostly as shuttle trains east of Newark, and were noted for their faster acceleration and higher top speeds, which may explain their limited use. Although matched sets were not over-powered, it was possible for MU trains to pull an additional freight car (most often milk cars), which would be coupled to the rear-end of the MU train. In later years, the 2-car off-peak configuration was abandoned in favor of a 4-car configuration for reliability purposes.

Outbound from Hoboken, commuters could ride on the Morristown Line (the mainline) to Dover, New Jersey, a trip of 38.3 miles (62 km). The Montclair Branch and Gladstone Branch diverged from the Morristown line at Roseville Avenue Station in Newark and Summit, respectively. The MUs ran off 3000 volt DC overhead electric wire, drawing current through pantographs. Due to the presence of overhead bridges along the line, the overhead catenary varied considerably in height. Where no height restrictions existed, the catenary was typically at 24 feet (7.3 m), but for some bridges the wire needed to drop in clearance, with Roseville Avenue being the point of lowest clearance at 15 feet 9 inches (4.80 m). This didn't affect the operation of the MUs, since they had been designed with these clearance differentials in mind, but the low clearances restricted the use of other trains on the line that had insufficient clearance. The Lackawanna MUs had two pantographs: one for normal use (on the Dover end of the motor car) and one with greater wire tension that was used only during ice storms (on the Hoboken end of the car). The trains lacked speedometers. On test runs, the trains attained a speed of 63 miles per hour (101 km/h) on level track. On suitable downgrades, however, the trains could reach 75 miles per hour (121 km/h).

== Types ==
=== Low-roof trailers ===
The Delaware, Lackawanna and Western Railroad purchased fifty suburban coaches from Pullman in 1925. The cars were 70 feet 6 inches (21.49 m) and had vestibules at both ends. The total seating capacity was 82. Originally numbered 300–349, they were converted to multiple unit trailers in 1930 and renumbered 2200–2249. The cars were referred to as "low roof" trailers to distinguish them from Pullman trailers built in 1917–1920 which had higher roofs. The low-roof trailers were 13 feet 0 inches (3.96 m) tall and weighed 109,400 pounds (49,600 kg). In 1961, they were renumbered 3200–3249. After retirement, the cars were stored at Mahwah, New Jersey, and listed for sale on March 9, 1984, and November 13, 1984.

=== High-roof trailers ===
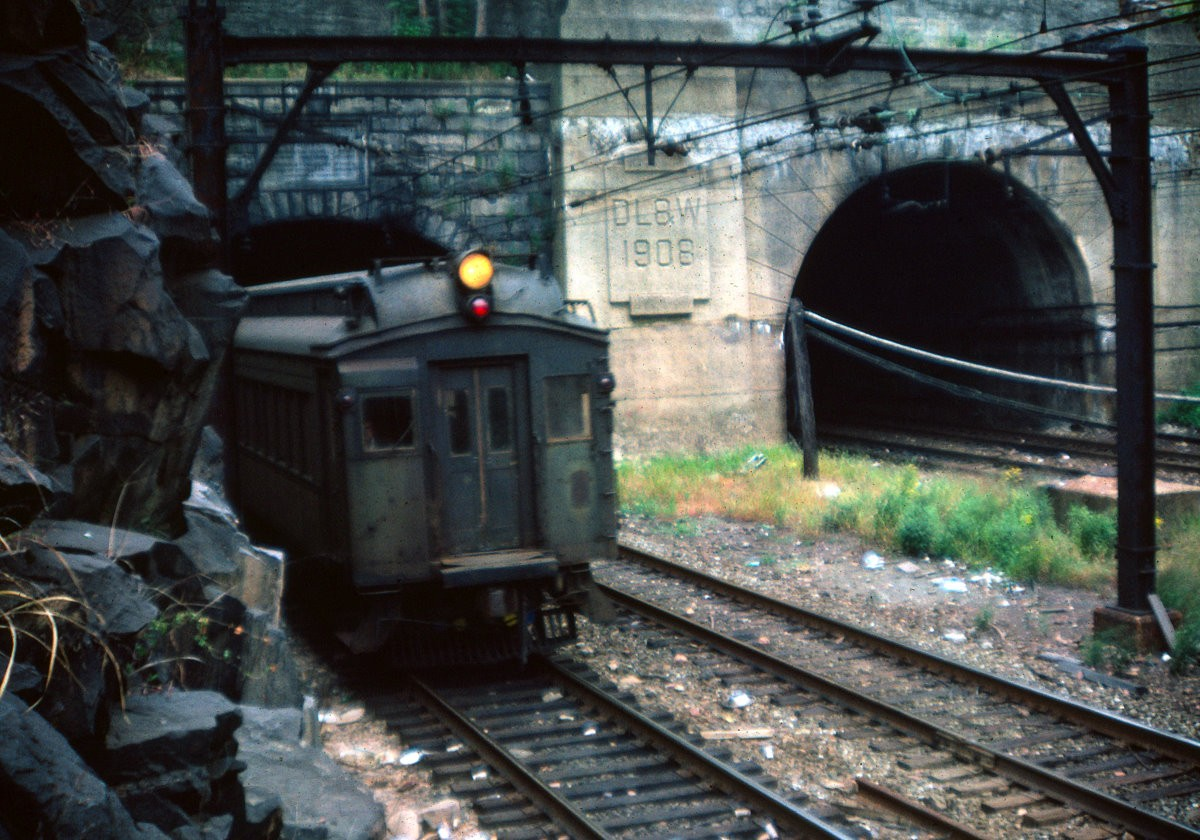
High roof trailer car leaves Bergen Hill Tunnels in August 1981

Pullman built 75 suburban coaches for the Lackwanna between 1917 and 1920. These cars had "high roofs", higher than the Pullman coaches delivered in 1925 or the motor cars built in 1930. 68 of these (nos. 648–715) were rebuilt as trailers in 1930 and renumbered 2300–2367. The cars were rebuilt by the American Car and Foundry Company, which added vestibules and converted the cars to electric heat. The cars were 70 feet 1 inch (21.36 m) long and could seat 78. The cars stood 14 feet 3 3/4 inches (4.362 m) tall and weighed 109,500 pounds (49,700 kg). In 1961, they were renumbered 3300–3367 and finally by NJT to 4300–4367.

=== Combine trailers ===
The Lackawanna rebuilt a total of 18 combine cars for multiple unit operation: fifteen baggage/express and three railway post offices (RPO). These cars were drawn from different batches. Combines 426–428 were built in 1917; 429–433 in 1921; 434–443 in 1925. Cars 426 and 442–423 were the RPOs. All save 426 were converted to MU trailers in 1930; 426 was converted later. The baggage express cars were renumbered 2400–2414; the RPOs 2440–2442. The RPOs were used on the Gladstone Branch and Dover Branch; at 22 miles (35 km), the Gladstone RPO made the shortest such run in the United States. In 1961 the combines were renumbered 3400–3415 and 3440–3441.

=== Club trailers ===
Lackawanna club cars 480–484 were built in 1912 by the Barney and Smith Car Company and car 647 in 1917 by Pullman. They were converted to MU trailers in 1930 and renumbered 2450 to 2455. In 1961, they were renumbered 3450–3455. Since the cars were subscription only, they were typically placed on the westbound (Dover-facing) end of the train.

=== Motor units ===
Between 1929 and 1930 Pullman and General Electric constructed 141 new electric multiple units for the suburban service. These were numbered 2500–2640. Each car could seat 84 passengers. The individual cars were 70 feet 2 inches (21.39 m) long, stood 15 feet 3 inches (4.65 m) high, and weighed 74 short tons (67 t). Four 255 horsepower (190 kW) traction motors permitted an acceleration of 1.5 miles per hour per second (2.4 km/(h⋅s)) and a maximum speed of 63 miles per hour (101 km/h), although they could reach 75 miles per hour (121 km/h) downhill.

== Preservation ==
Numerous cars have been preserved on tourist lines and in museums. Holders include:

- Berkshire Scenic Railway Museum
- Coopersville and Marne Railway
- Everett Railroad
- Grapevine Vintage Railroad
- Middletown and Hummelstown Railroad
- Oil Creek and Titusville Railroad
- Pacific Southwest Railway Museum
- Reading Blue Mountain and Northern Railroad
- Rochester & Genesee Valley Railroad Museum
- Steamtown National Historic Site
- Southern Prairie Railway
- Valley Railroad Company
- Whippany Railway Museum
