= Middletown and Hummelstown Railroad =

Railway line in the Pennsylvania

Middletown & Hummelstown Railroad

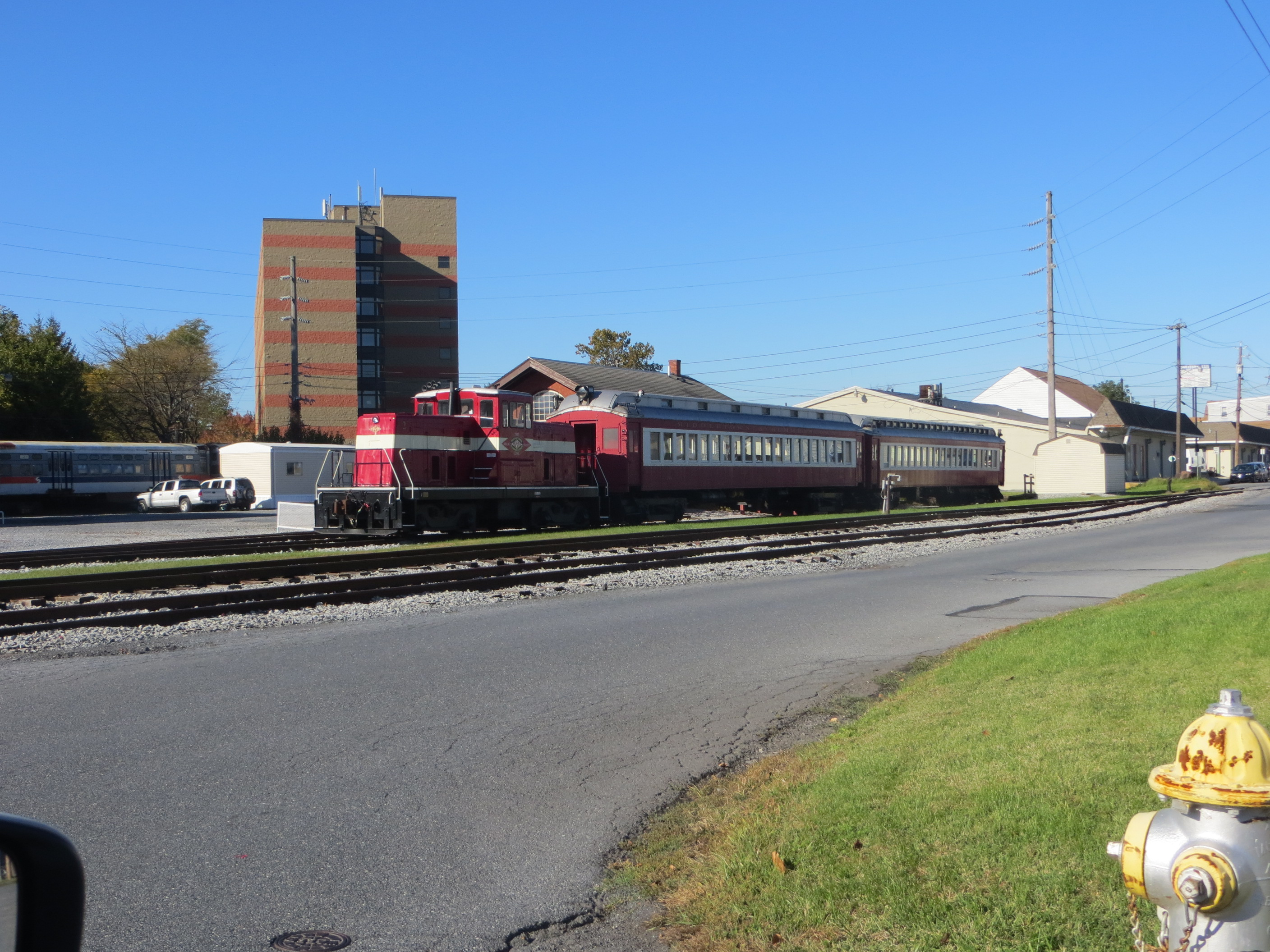

Overview
- Headquarters: Middletown, Pennsylvania
- Reporting mark: MIDH
- Locale: Dauphin County, Pennsylvania
- Dates of operation: 1976–present

Technical
- Track gauge: 4 ft 8 1/2 in (1,435 mm) standard gauge
- Length: 7 miles (11 km)

Other
- Website: www.mhrailroad.com/%20mhrailroad.com

The Middletown and Hummelstown Railroad (reporting mark MIDH) is a shortline railroad which operates freight and tourist passenger trains between Middletown to Hummelstown, Pennsylvania.

== Passenger excursion trains ==
The Middletown and Hummelstown Railroad (M&H) uses both steam and diesel locomotives for passenger excursions. Coaches are 1920s-vintage Delaware, Lackawanna & Western High-Roof MU Trailers. Passengers board at the 1891-era freight station in Middletown for an 11-mile (18 km) round-trip excursion along the Swatara Creek and Union Canal; a narrator relates history of the canal and various sites along the trip.

There is also a collection of heritage railway rolling stock displayed at Middletown Yard. A 1969 engine is used to transport freight trains. Freight service has been provided since 1976 and passenger excursion service has been provided since 1986.

== U.S. Route 322 restriction ==
Though M&H owns all trackage between its two namesake towns, it only regularly operated as far north as Indian Echo Caverns until 2011. U.S. Route 322, a four-lane limited-access highway, lies between Indian Echo Caverns and the town of Hummelstown, where M&H connects with Norfolk Southern Railway's (NS) Harrisburg Line. PennDOT restricted M&H to just 12 crossings per year. However, M&H had requested additional crossing allowances and was willing to install additional crossing safety hardware.

Freight business is minimal on M&H, primarily due to the restricted access to NS in Hummelstown. M&H has stated that this restriction greatly hampers growing freight potential. PennDOT said it believes more discussion regarding warning devices for the crossing is needed given the volume and type of traffic on Route 322. In addition, the Hummelstown Borough Council has expressed "not in my backyard" concerns with having additional freight trains passing through town.

== 2011 flood damage ==
Historic flooding in September 2011 from Tropical Storm Lee damaged significant parts of the railway along Swatara Creek, including completely washing out the northern approach to the bridge crossing the creek. Repairs have been estimated to cost between $250,000 and $300,000, and thus the route stops short and no longer reaches Indian Echo Caverns or Hummelstown.

== 2014 transformer delivery ==
On Friday, January 24, a leased NS locomotive operated by M&H crew delivered a transformer, using line, to the PPL sub station on Fiddlers Elbow Road. Following extensive track repairs to the line, north of the 322 crossing over the summer, the transformer was delivered by NS Engine GP38-2 #5046. The transformer was brought in from the NS connection line, crossed U.S. Route 322 and then used the spur line to deliver the transformer to the sub station. It would be the first time since 1994 that a transformer was delivered to the substation via M&H.

== Equipment ==
=== Locomotives ===
Locomotive details
Number	Images	Original owner	Original number	Manufacturer	Type	Built	Status
1		US Army	7272	GE Transportation	60-ton switcher	1941	Operational
2		Standard Slag and Stone Co.	46	GE Transportation	65-ton switcher	1955	Operational
66		Kansas City Public Service	Unknown	GE Transportation	Steeplecab	1948	Inoperable
91		Canadian National Railway	1013	Canadian Locomotive Company	2-6-0	1910	Undergoing 1,472-day inspection and overhaul
151		Western Maryland Railway	151	American Locomotive Company	S-6	1956	Operational
1016		Newburgh and South Shore Railroad	1016	American Locomotive Company	T-6	1969	Operational

=== Trolleys ===
Locomotive details
Number	Original owner	Original number	Manufacturer	Type	Built	Notes
9425	South Brooklyn Railway	9425	Unknown	Trolley Freight Car	1903	Sold
4550	Brooklyn Rapid Transit	4550	Unknown	Unknown	1911	Sold
C121	Philadelphia Rapid Transit Co.	C121	Brill	Unknown	1923	Sold
77	Philadelphia Suburban Transit	77	Brill	Unknown	1932	Sold
86	Philadelphia Suburban Transit	86	Brill	Unknown	1932	Sold
3323	Dallas Railway and Terminal Co.	3323	Brill	Unknown	1945	Sold
162	York Railways	162	Brill	Unknown	1924	Donated to the Rockhill Trolley Museum in January 2025.
441	Rio de Janeiro Tram Co.	441	Unknown	Single Truck Trolley	1909	Sold
1719	Rio de Janeiro Tram Co.	1719	Unknown	Unknown	1911	Sold to the Fox River Trolley Museum in March 2025.

=== Coaches ===
Rolling stock details
Number	Original owner	Original number	Manufacturer	Type	Built	Notes
302	Delaware, Lackawanna and Western Railroad	2302	Pullman Company	DL&W High Roof MU Coach Type 1	1916-1920	Erie Lackawanna #3302, NJ Transit #4302
307	Delaware, Lackawanna and Western Railroad	2307	Pullman Company	DL&W High Roof MU Coach Type 1	1916-1920	Erie Lackawanna #3307, NJ Transit #4307
329	Delaware, Lackawanna and Western Railroad	2329	Pullman Company	DL&W High Roof MU Coach Type 1	1916-1920	Erie Lackawanna #3339, NJ Transit #4339. Equipped with a bell and ditch lights
330	Delaware, Lackawanna and Western Railroad	2330	Pullman Company	DL&W High Roof MU Coach Type 1	1916-1920	Erie Lackawanna #3330, NJ Transit #4330 Lettered as Gettysburg 330
343	Delaware, Lackawanna and Western Railroad	2343	Pullman Company	DL&W High Roof MU Coach Type 2	1920	Erie Lackawanna #3343, NJ Transit #4343 originally built by Pullman in 1920, Converted to MU car and renumbered along with 29 other cars in 1930
352	Delaware, Lackawanna and Western Railroad	2352	Pullman Company	DL&W High Roof MU Coach Type 2	1920	Erie Lackawanna #3352, NJ Transit #4352 originally built by Pullman in 1920, Converted to MU car and renumbered along with 29 other cars in 1930
366	Delaware, Lackawanna and Western Railroad	2366	Pullman Company	DL&W High Roof MU Coach Type 2	1920	Erie Lackawanna #3366, NJ Transit #4366 originally built by Pullman in 1920, Converted to MU car and renumbered along with 29 other cars in 1930
9269	Pennsylvania Railroad	9269	Unknown	Baggage Car	Unknown	
726	Delaware, Lackawanna and Western Railroad	Unknown	Unknown	"Boonton" Combine	Unknown	In Gettysburg Livery

=== Cabins ===
Rolling stock details
Number	Original owner	Original number	Manufacturer	Type	Built
18871	Central Railroad of New Jersey	18871	Unknown	Cupola	Unknown
95123	Lehigh Valley Railroad	95123	Unknown	Cupola	Unknown

=== Freight cars ===
Rolling stock details
Number	Original owner	Original number	Manufacturer	Type	Built
407	Philadelphia and Western Railroad	407	Unknown	Flatcar	Unknown
99398	Detroit, Toledo and Ironton Railroad	99398	Diffco	Side-dump car	Unknown
106362	Chesapeake and Ohio Railway	106362	Unknown	Hopper car	Unknown
90388	Pacific Fruit Express	90388	Unknown	Refrigerator car	Unknown
7769	Railway Express Agency	7769	Unknown	Refrigerator car	Unknown
