= Southern Prairie Railway =

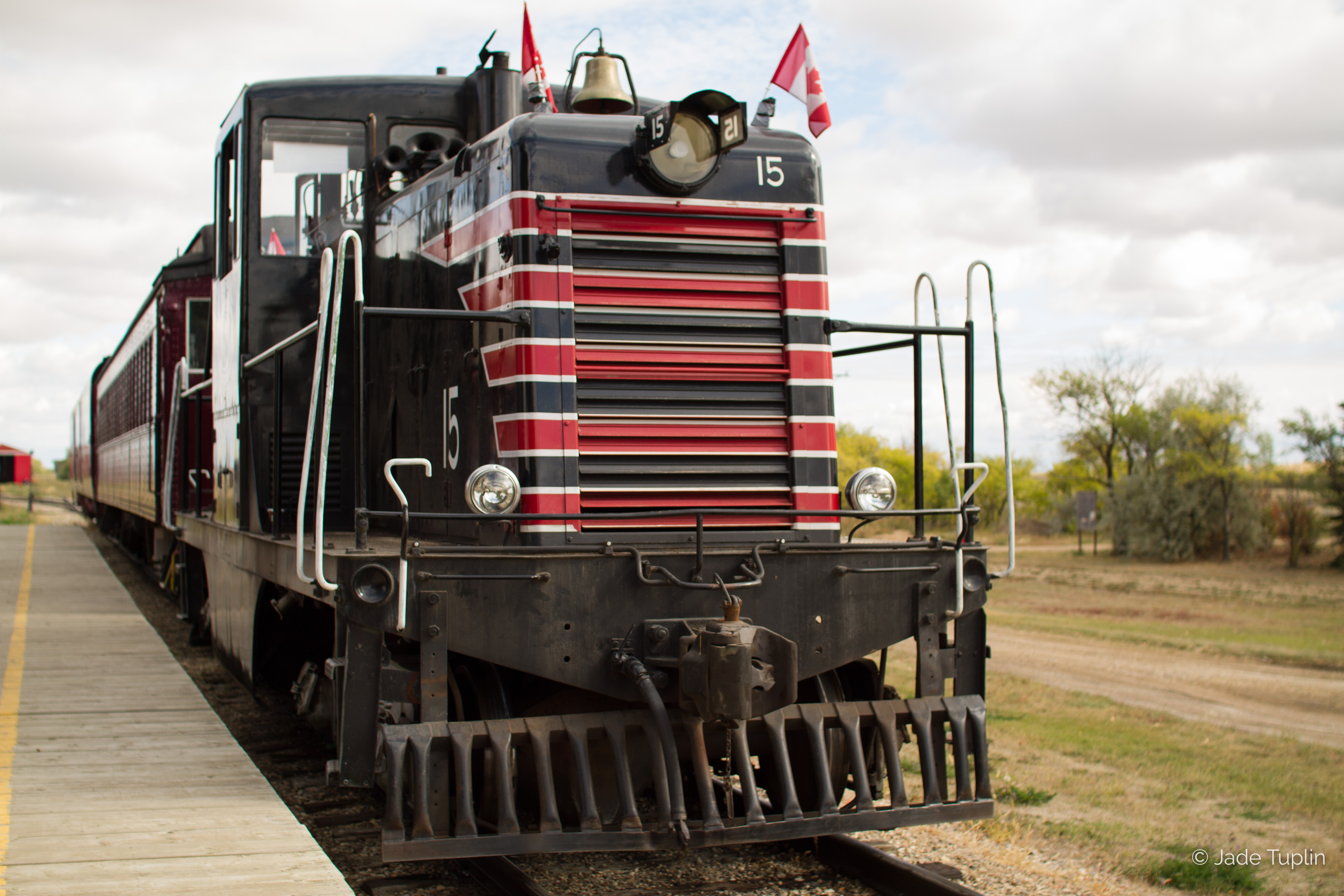

Commercial operations
- Built by: Canadian Pacific Railway
- Original gauge: 4 ft 8 1/2 in (1,435 mm)

Preserved operations
- Stations: Ogema
- Length: 58 km
- Preserved gauge: 4 ft 8 1/2 in (1,435 mm)

Commercial history
- Opened: 1910
- Closed: 1915

Preservation history
- 1999: Red Coat Road and Rail purchases 115 km of abandoned CP Rail line from Pangman, SK to Assiniboia, SK
- 2010: Ogema Heritage Railway Association agrees to operate a tourist railway on Red Coat Road and Rail line
- 2012: Southern Prairie Railway begins operations as a tourist railway
- Headquarters: Ogema, Saskatchewan, Canada

Website
- www.southernprairierailway.com

Southern Prairie Railway is a tourist railway operated by the Ogema Heritage Railway Association (OHRA) in Ogema, Saskatchewan.

== History ==
Southern Prairie Railway offers train tours that travel from Ogema to Pangman, Saskatchewan and Horizon, Saskatchewan. The tours operate on weekends from May to October. Chartered trips are also available.

The centerpiece of their operation is a fully restored 1912 CP Rail train station. The station was moved to Ogema from Simpson, Saskatchewan in 2002, as the original station was removed in the 1960s. The feature engine is a 1945 GE "44 tonner" diesel locomotive purchased in 2010 from Conway Scenic Railroad in North Conway, New Hampshire. Also purchased in 2010, the 1925 Pullman low-roof passenger car arrived from Gettysburg, Pennsylvania, and received a top-to-bottom restoration. Staff and volunteers are also working to restore a 1952 CP Rail baggage car and a 1977 CP Rail wide-vision caboose to join the fleet.

== Equipment ==
=== Locomotives ===
Locomotive details
Images	Number	Type	Class	Built	Builder	Serial number	Status
15		Diesel	44-ton switcher	1945	General Electric	27975	Operational

=== Rolling stock ===
Rolling stock details
Number	Images	Type	Built	Builder
1595		Passenger car	1925	Pullman Company
Unknown		Baggage car	1952	Canadian Car and Foundry Company
434590		Caboose	1977	Canadian Pacific Railroad
