= Lee station (Massachusetts) =

Lee
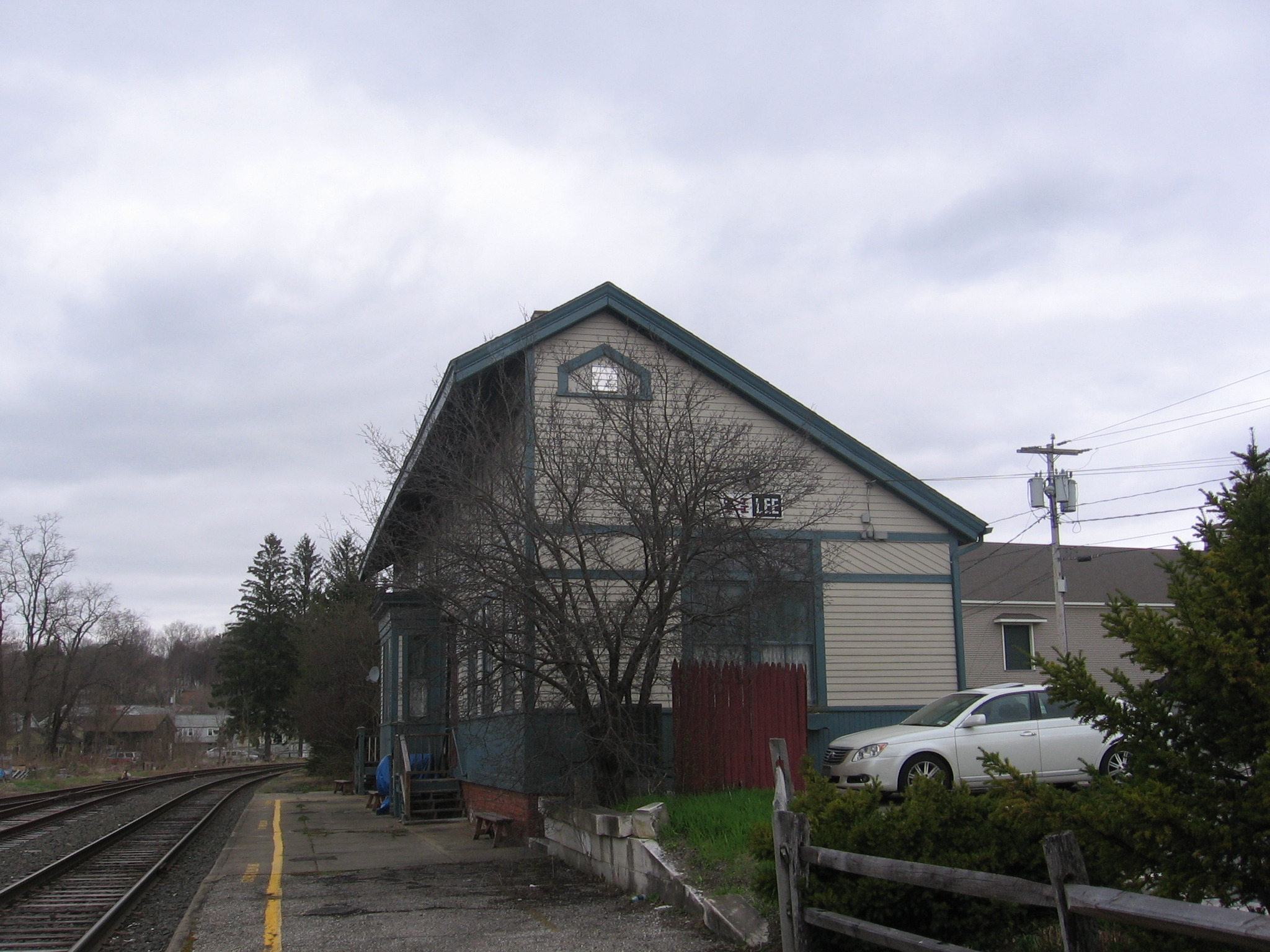
- The former station in 2012

General information
- Location: 109 Railroad Street; Lee, Massachusetts

Former services
Preceding station	New York, New Haven and Hartford Railroad	Following station
Stockbridge toward Norwalk and South Norwalk	Pittsfield Branch	Lenox toward Pittsfield
- Lee Station
- U.S. National Register of Historic Places
- Interactive map of Lee Station
- Coordinates: 42°18′25″N 73°15′6″W
- Built: 1894
- NRHP reference No.: 10001067
- Added to NRHP: December 27, 2010
Location

Lee station is a former railroad station in Lee, Massachusetts. It was built in 1893 to serve passenger traffic on the Housatonic Railroad, which operated the tracks that run through the town between Pittsfield to the north and Connecticut to the south. It served as the town's main passenger station until passenger service was terminated in 1971 by the Penn Central Railroad, the NYNH&H's successor. In 1976 the building was converted to office use, and in 1981 it was rehabilitated and opened as a restaurant. It also serves excursions of the Berkshire Scenic Railway Museum. It was added to the National Register of Historic Places in 2010 as Lee Station.

== Description and history ==
Lee station is located in the village center of Lee, on the west side of Railroad Street at its junction with Elm Street, one block west of Main Street (U.S. Route 20). It is set parallel to railroad tracks running north-south to its west, which roughly parallel the Housatonic River further west. The station is a single-story wood frame structure, set on a brick basement that is exposed on the track side due to sloping terrain. The exterior is finished in a combination of wooden clapboards and bands of shingles in the Queen Anne style. The street facade has ten asymmetrically placed bays, eight of which have windows and two have doors. The main entrance is located in one of the central bays. The track facade has nine bays, with a central projecting section which originally housed the agent's office.

The station was built in 1893 by the Housatonic Railroad shortly before it was absorbed by the New York, New Haven and Hartford Railroad (NYNH&H). It served as a combination station, serving both passengers and freight. In peak mid-20th century years of passenger service, the Berkshire, Housatonic, Litchfield, Mahaiwe, Mahkeenac, Taconic, Umpachanee, and unnamed trains made stops at the station on trips between New York City and Pittsfield. Passenger service ended in 1971 and freight service ended in 1973. The railroad played an important role in the town's economy, bringing its manufactured goods (principally paper) and raw materials to market, and bring vacationers to the area's summer estates and boarding houses. It was the busiest station on the line between the major stops of Pittsfield, Massachusetts and Bridgeport, Connecticut.

The station, considered surplus by the Penn Central, was sold to private owners in 1976, who first operated a real estate business there, before converting it to a restaurant in 1981.

== See also ==
- National Register of Historic Places listings in Berkshire County, Massachusetts
