= Taconic and West Avenues Historic District =

Historic district in Massachusetts, United States

- U.S. National Register of Historic Places
- U.S. Historic district
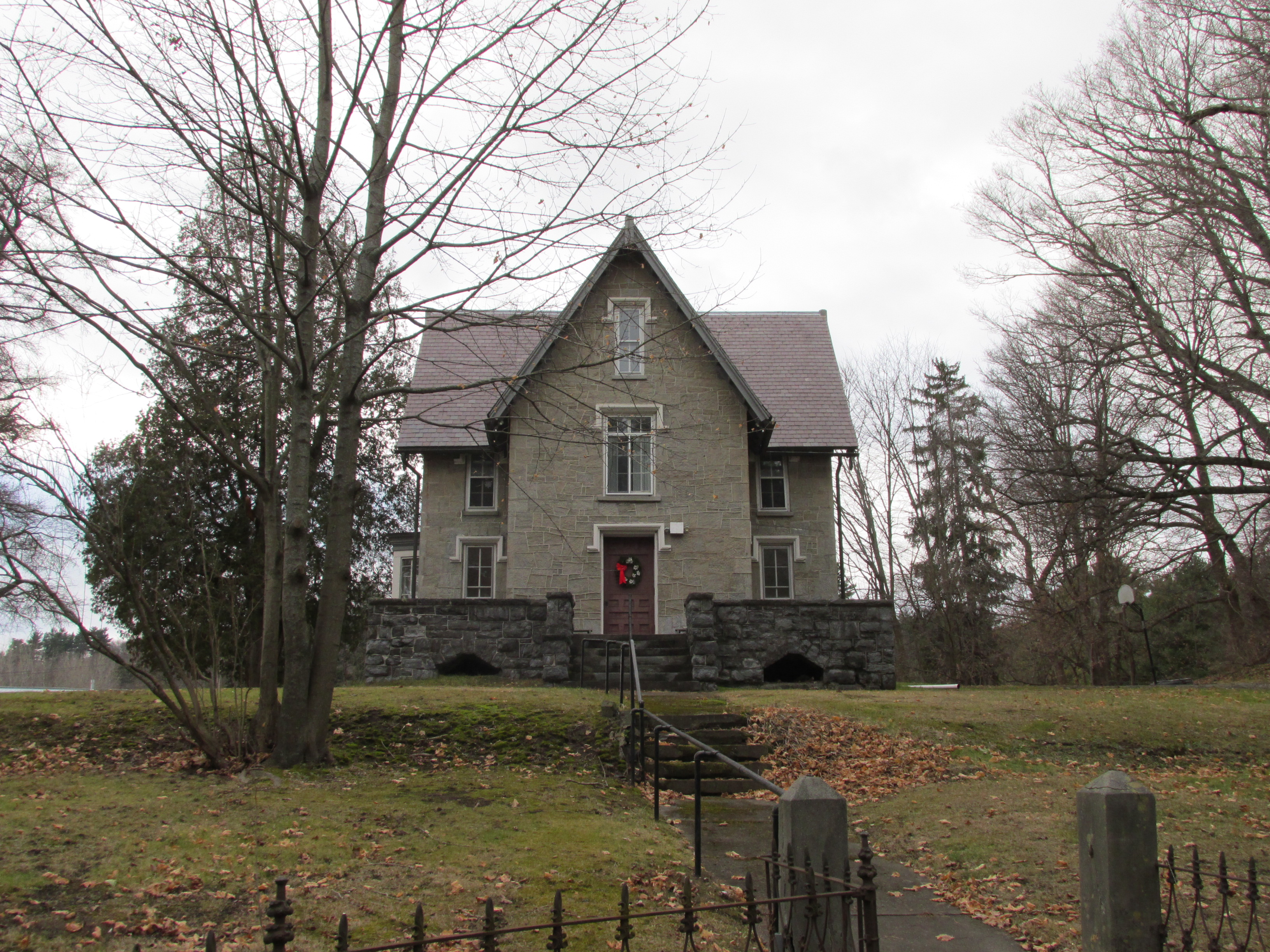
- First Church of Christ Scientist

- Location within Massachusetts Location within the United States
- Location: Great Barrington, Massachusetts
- Coordinates: 42°11′27″N 73°22′5″W
- Area: 117 acres (47 ha)
- Architect: Allen, Daniel; et al.
- Architectural style: Georgian, Early Republic, Mid 19th Century Revival
- NRHP reference No.: 98000680
- Added to NRHP: June 11, 1998

The Taconic and West Avenues Historic District is a largely residential historic district south of the downtown area of Great Barrington, Massachusetts. The roughly 117-acre (47 ha) district includes 172 contributing elements, most of which are houses or related buildings. Two thirds of the buildings were built between 1890 and 1910, and most of the rest were constructed in a historically sympathetic way.

The southwestern corner of the district is the intersection of Maple and West Avenues. Its western boundary is a high wooded ridge that roughly parallels Castle Street, and follows Main Street and Maple Avenue on its eastern and southern boundaries. The housing in the district was built by Great Barrington's wealthier residents, and feature large houses built in a variety of popular styles of the period. The district features Georgian, Early Republic, and Mid 19th-Century Revival architecture. It was added to the National Register of Historic Places in 1998.

Great Barrington was settled in the 18th century, and was the first county seat of Berkshire County. It developed around a major crossing of the Housatonic River, which also provided power for industry. Early development in this district occurred primarily along Main Street, where houses such as the Dwight–Henderson House were built, and Taconic Street, a major road leading northwest toward Alford. Development in the district was modest through much of the 19th century, only becoming more organized in the 1880s, when a number of cross streets were laid out for residential development.

== See also ==
- Great Barrington Station
- National Register of Historic Places listings in Berkshire County, Massachusetts
