= Atlantic Express and Pacific Express =

Former American passenger trains

Atlantic Express [east] and Pacific Express [west]
Overview
- Service type: Inter-city rail
- Status: Discontinued
- Locale: Midwestern United States/Northeastern United States
- First service: 1885
- Last service: 1965
- Former operator(s): Erie Railroad after 1960: Erie-Lackawanna Railroad

Route
- Termini: Jersey City, New Jersey/ 1956-1965:Hoboken, New Jersey; Chicago, Illinois
- Distance travelled: 998.7 miles (1,607.3 km) [1954]
- Service frequency: Daily
- Train number(s): East: 8 West: 7 [1954]

On-board services
- Seating arrangements: Coaches
- Sleeping arrangements: Open sections, roomettes and double bedrooms [1954]
- Catering facilities: Diner-lounge car

Technical
- Track gauge: 4 ft 8 1/2 in (1,435 mm) standard gauge

The Atlantic Express and Pacific Express were a pair of Erie Railroad passenger trains which together provided round-trip service between the New York City area and Chicago, Illinois. They were the Erie's oldest named passenger trains, having been named in 1885 and discontinued in 1965 under the Erie Lackawanna Railway, successor to the Erie. Specifically, the train originated at the Erie Railroad's Pavonia Terminal in Jersey City, New Jersey until 1956. For the last nine years the train began at the Delaware, Lackawanna and Western's Hoboken Terminal in Hoboken, New Jersey. For the last five years the train was an Erie Lackawanna Railroad train, as the Erie and the Lackawanna railroads merged in 1960. It was the last long distance passenger train to run along the Erie Main Line.
