= Dwight–Henderson House =

Historic house in Massachusetts, United States

- U.S. National Register of Historic Places
- U.S. Historic district – Contributing property
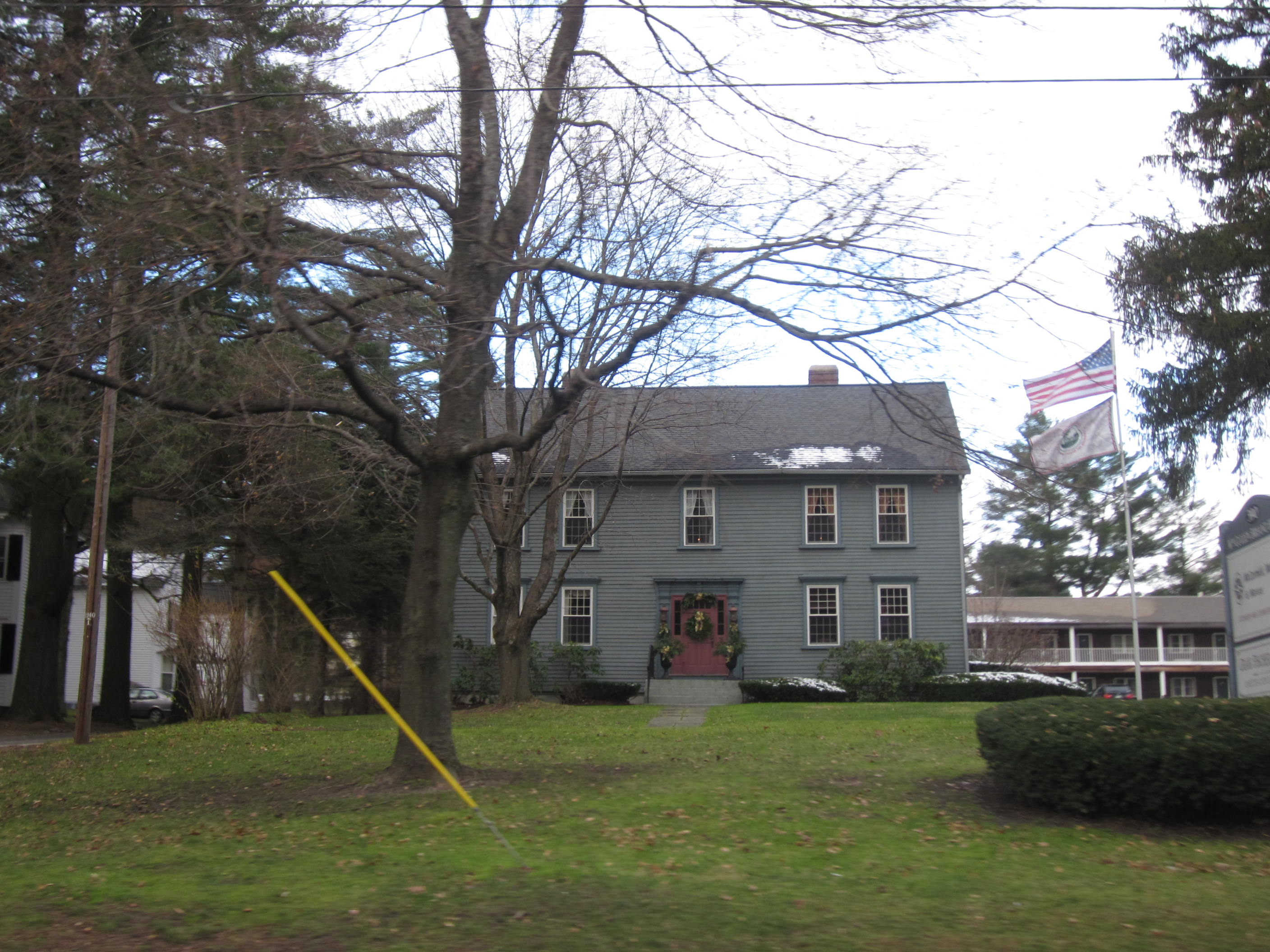

- Location within Massachusetts Location within the United States
- Location: Great Barrington, Massachusetts
- Coordinates: 42°11′29″N 73°21′56″W
- Built: 1759
- Architect: Allen, Daniel
- Architectural style: Historical
- Part of: Taconic and West Avenues Historic District (ID98000680)
- NRHP reference No.: 76000237

Significant dates
- Added to NRHP: March 26, 1976
- Designated CP: June 11, 1998

The Dwight–Henderson House is a historic house at 390 Main Street in Great Barrington, Massachusetts. It is the second oldest house in Great Barrington, built in 1759 for Joseph Dwight, a brigadier in the colonial militia, by local builder Daniel Allen. The saltbox home was originally built into a slope, and had three stories on the front and one in the rear. The house has been moved twice, but remains within 200 feet (61 m) of its original site. The second move, the foundation that formed the wall for the original first floor, so it now presents only two stories in front.

The house is notable for several historical associations. In addition to General Dwight, who was also town moderator and selectman, and a county judge, the houses notable guests include British General John Burgoyne, who surrendered his army after the Battles of Saratoga in 1777, and spent several days here while en route to the Boston area as a prisoner. It is also the house where poet and newspaper editor William Cullen Bryant was married; he was a guest of the owner, Allen Henderson.

Since then, the house has seen a variety of uses. It served for a time as housing for the nearby Berkshire Motor Inn, and now houses professional offices. The house was listed on the National Register of Historic Places in 1976, and included as a contributing property to the Taconic and West Avenues Historic District in 1998.

== See also ==
- National Register of Historic Places listings in Berkshire County, Massachusetts
