= Arrow (railcar) =

Railcar

Arrow I/II/III
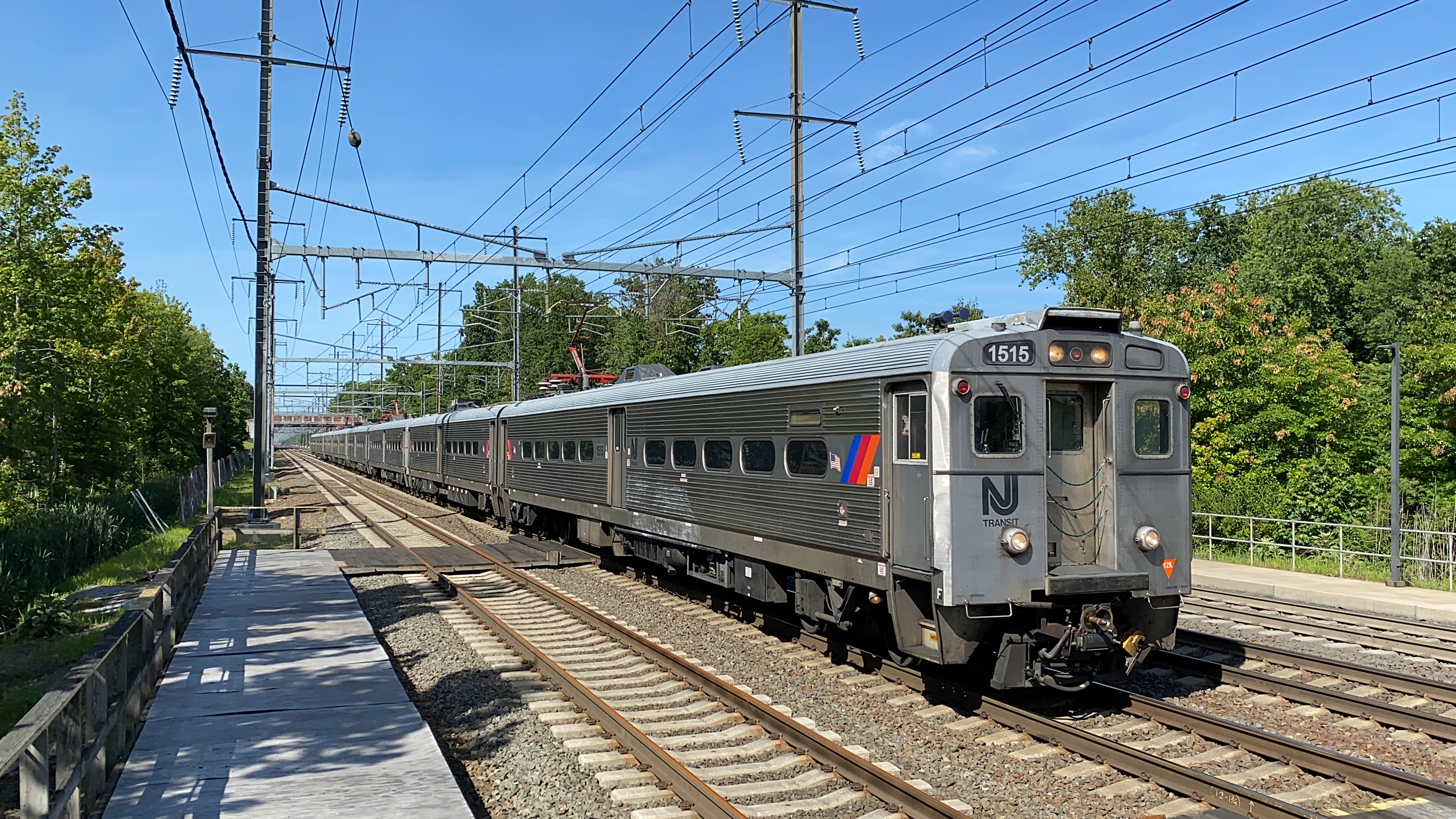
- New Jersey Transit train 3936 led by Arrow III #1515 pulls into Princeton Junction.

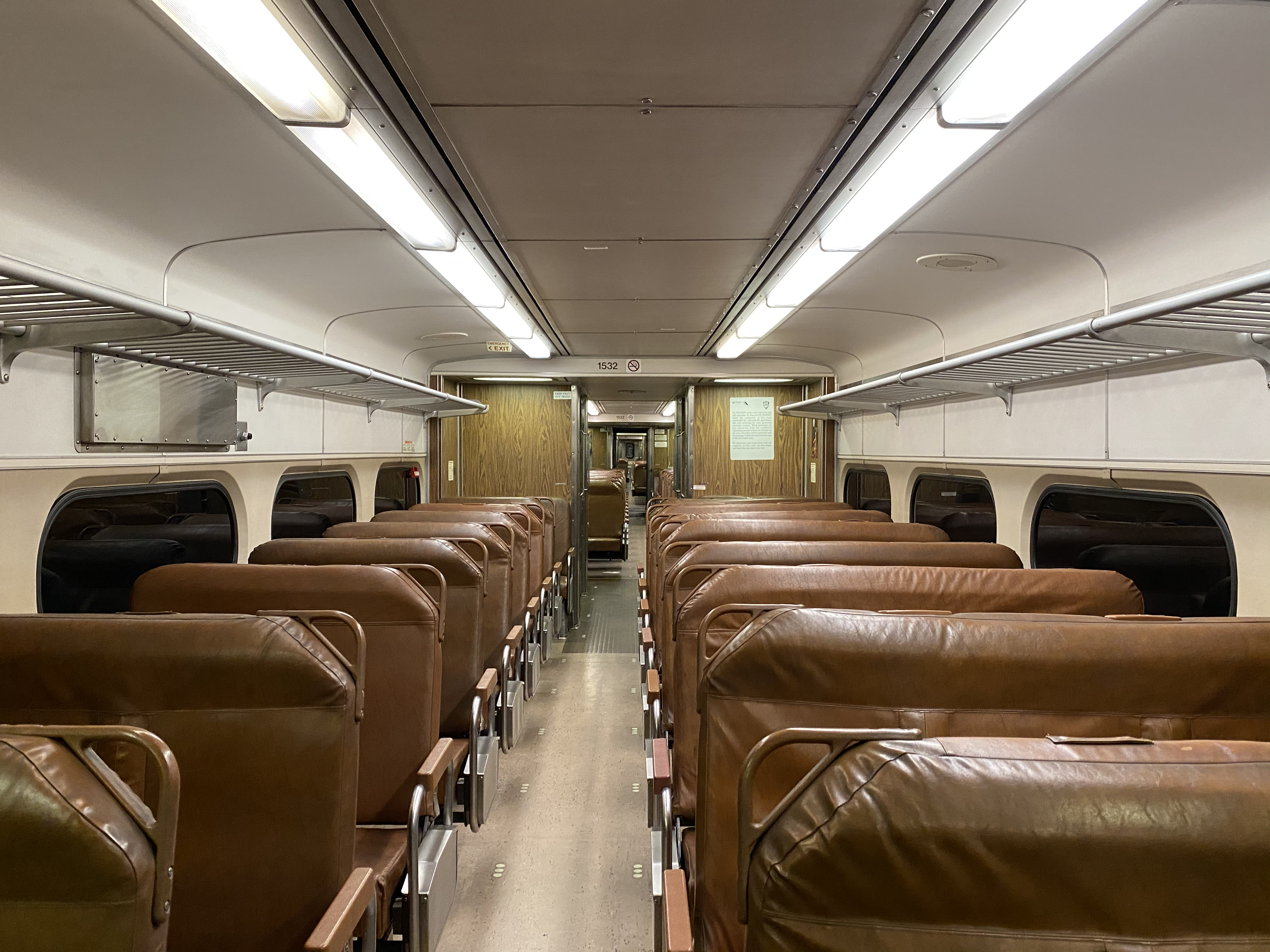
- Interior of an Arrow III car.
- Stock type: Electric multiple unit
- In service: Arrow I: 1968–1980; Arrow II: 1974–1997; Arrow III: 1977–present
- Manufacturers: Arrow I: St. Louis Car Company; Arrow II/III: General Electric, Avco
- Family name: Jersey Arrow
- Replaced: Lackawanna Railroad MU; Pennsylvania Railroad MP54
- Refurbished: 1992–1995 (Arrow IIIs)
- Number built: Arrow I: 35; Arrow II: 70; Arrow III: 230
- Successor: Alstom MultiLevel III EMU (planned)
- Formation: Arrow I/III: Single unit; Arrow II/III: Married pair
- Fleet numbers: Arrow I: 1200–1233 ex 100–134; Arrow I Rebuild: 500–533; Arrow II: 1234–1303; Arrow III: 1304–1533
- Operators: Penn Central Railroad; Conrail (under NJDOT); New Jersey Transit
- Lines served: Northeast Corridor Line; Princeton Branch; North Jersey Coast Line; Morris & Essex Lines (Arrow II and III only)

Specifications
- Car body construction: Stainless steel
- Car length: 85 ft (26 m)
- Width: 9 ft 11 1/2 in (3,035 mm)
- Doors: 2 end doors with traps; 1 middle door high level only
- Maximum speed: 80–100 mph (130–160 km/h) (Arrow III, post-rebuild)
- Weight: 124,500 lb (56,472 kg) (Arrow III A & B cars); 132,500 lb (60,101 kg) (Arrow III S cars)
- Traction system: Ignitron rectifier (Arrow I/II) or SCR (Arrow III pre-rehab) AC-DC phase-fired controller; ABB GTO–VVVF (Arrow III post-rehab)
- Power output: Arrow III rebuilt (pair): 1,125 hp (839 kW); Arrow III rebuilt (single): 750 hp (560 kW)
- Electric systems: Overhead line; 12 kV 25 Hz AC (Arrow I/II/III); 25 kV 60 Hz AC (Arrow II/III)
- Current collection: Pantograph
- AAR wheel arrangement: B-B (single cars); B-B+B-B (Arrow II, Arrow III married pairs pre-rebuild); B-B+B-2 (Arrow III married pairs, post rebuild)
- Wheels driven: 4 (single cars); 6 (Arrow III married pairs, post rebuild); 8 (Arrow II, Arrow III married pairs pre-rebuild)
- Bogies: General Steel GSI 70
- Braking systems: Pneumatic, dynamic
- Coupling system: WABCO Model N-2
- Multiple working: Yes (conditional by era and rebuild status)
- Track gauge: 1,435 mm (4 ft 8 1/2 in)

The Jersey Arrow is a type of electric multiple unit (EMU) railcar developed for the Pennsylvania Railroad, and used by successive commuter rail operators in New Jersey, through to NJ Transit. Three models were built, but only the third model remains in use today. The series is similar to SEPTA's Silverliner series but include center doors, among other differences in details.

== Arrow I ==
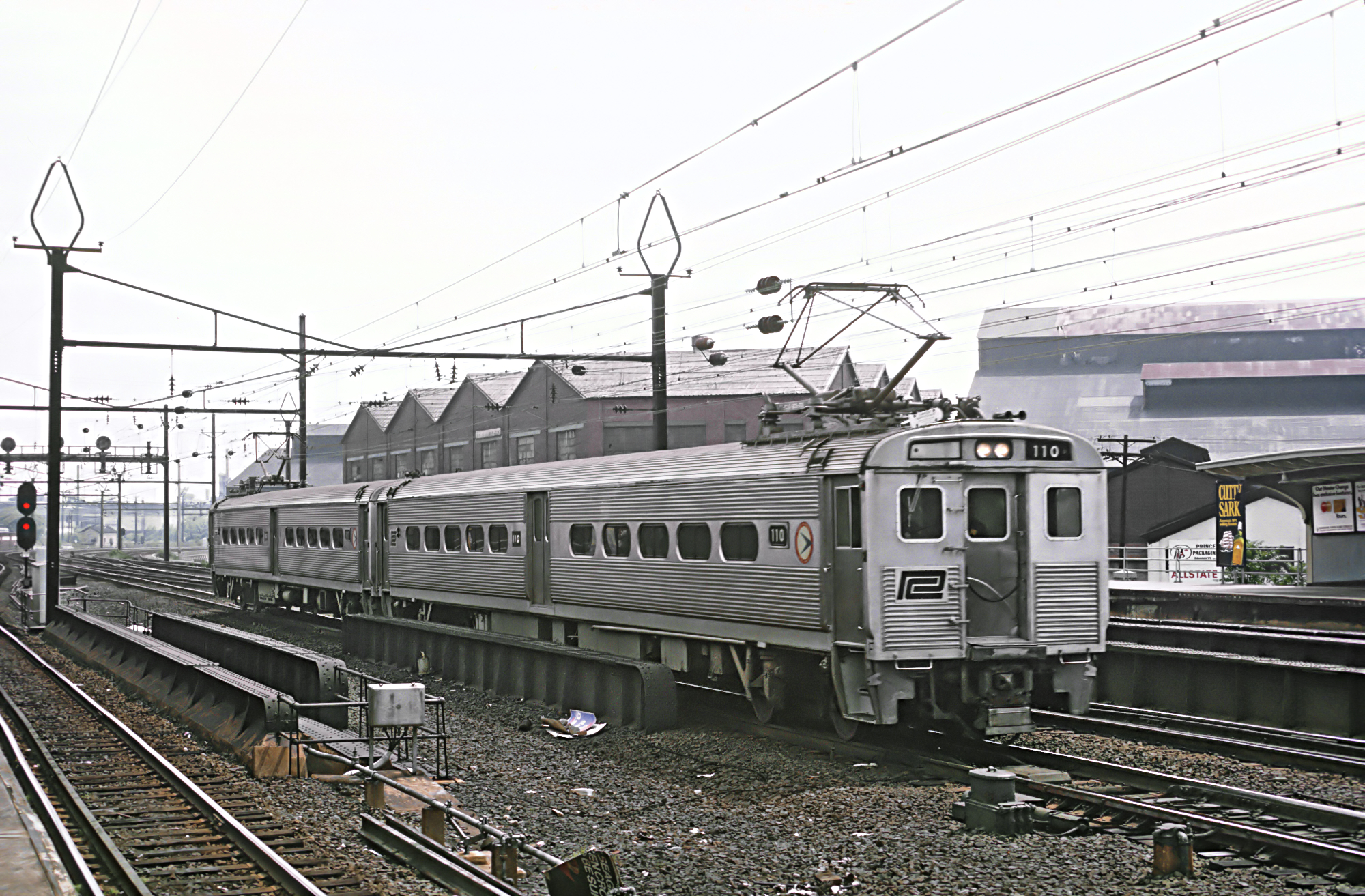
A two-car set of Arrow I cars in Penn Central service at Harrison in 1969

The first series of Arrows (classed MA-1A or PRR MP85E6) were built in 1968–69 by the St. Louis Car Company; 35 were built and purchased by the New Jersey Department of Transportation (NJDOT). These cars were initially numbered 100–134. These cars were built with higher capacity 3-2 seating.

In 1966, the NJDOT ordered 35 PRR "MP85" class MU cars from St. Louis Car for high speed service between New York and Trenton with a design based on the SEPTA/PSIC (Passenger Service Improvement Corporation) Silverliner III units then under order from St. Louis Car. The first two cars (100 and 101) were delivered in August 1968 and passenger service for the New Jersey Arrows began October 30, 1968. The body and structure (except end sills and bolsters) was all stainless steel. The stainless sheetmetal that made up the sides, ends and roof were load-carrying as part of an integral (monocoque) structure with the stainless center sill.

Although these cars bear some resemblance to the Silverliner III also produced by St. Louis Car at the time, they are very different mechanically. They featured diamond-shaped twin-arm Stemmann pantographs, rounder windows, a right-side operating controls, center doors, and a different body shape. The Arrow I used Westinghouse SCR "Tracpak" propulsion units with 700 HP per car with four motors; while the Silverliners had GE air-cooled Ignitrons.

Car 107 caught fire early in its career and was scrapped. Car 105 was also severely damaged in a collision in the East River Tunnel near New York Penn Station in 1975. It was stored in Sunnyside Yard until the mid-1980s, when it was scrapped.

During 1976, 19 of the 33 surviving Arrow Is were rebuilt to be compatible with the new Arrow IIs. This involved the replacement of Symington-Wayne SW800 "hook type" couplers with the Wabco N2A couplers used by subsequent Arrow MUs. As they were rebuilt, they were renumbered 500–533, with car 134 being renumbered 507 to account for the loss of 107.

A further renumbering of the Arrow Is to 1200-1233 was planned; however, this was never implemented as the Arrow Is were instead retired. The Arrow Is were stored as the Arrow IIIs arrived from General Electric. All cars were out of service by 1980 due to reliability issues with their Westinghouse control equipment. These problems were a result of poor wiring and frequent electrical grounds.

=== Comet IB conversion ===
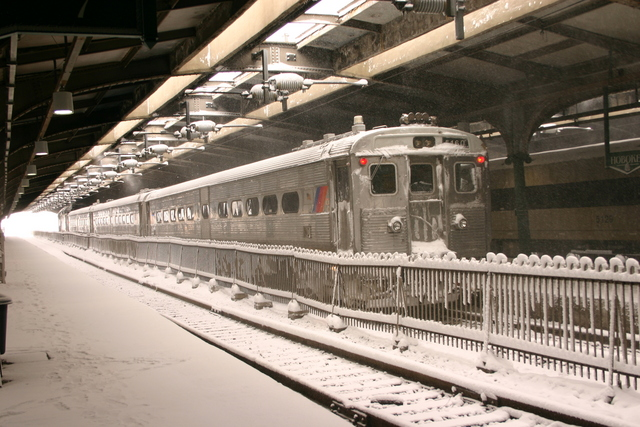
An NJT Comet IB at Hoboken Terminal

The Arrow I cars sat unused until 1986. Realizing that the car bodies still had many decades of service left on them, New Jersey Transit made the decision to have them rebuilt into locomotive-hauled coaches, nicknamed Comaro coaches. Thirty cars were converted in 1987–88 into the Comet IB cab control cars and trailer coaches by Morrison-Knudsen at the Hornell, New York shop. Three Arrow Is, 519, 521 and 523, were heavily damaged by arson, and were salvaged for use in the Comet IB program before being scrapped. The rebuilt Comet IB cars remained in service for two decades (first on Newark Division diesel service, and then transferred to Hoboken Division diesel lines in 2005) before being retired by New Jersey Transit in late 2008, with some now leased or sold, and others since scrapped.

Fourteen were rebuilt again for Amtrak California (Caltrans) as interim coaches. Cabs were removed from the 12 cab cars, and the interiors rebuilt to resemble Amtrak coaches, with 64-passenger intercity seating installed in place of the old commuter seating. The 14 rebuilt Caltrans Comet IBs were overhauled and delivered between 2013 and 2014 and are in service on the Gold Runner line.

== Arrow II ==
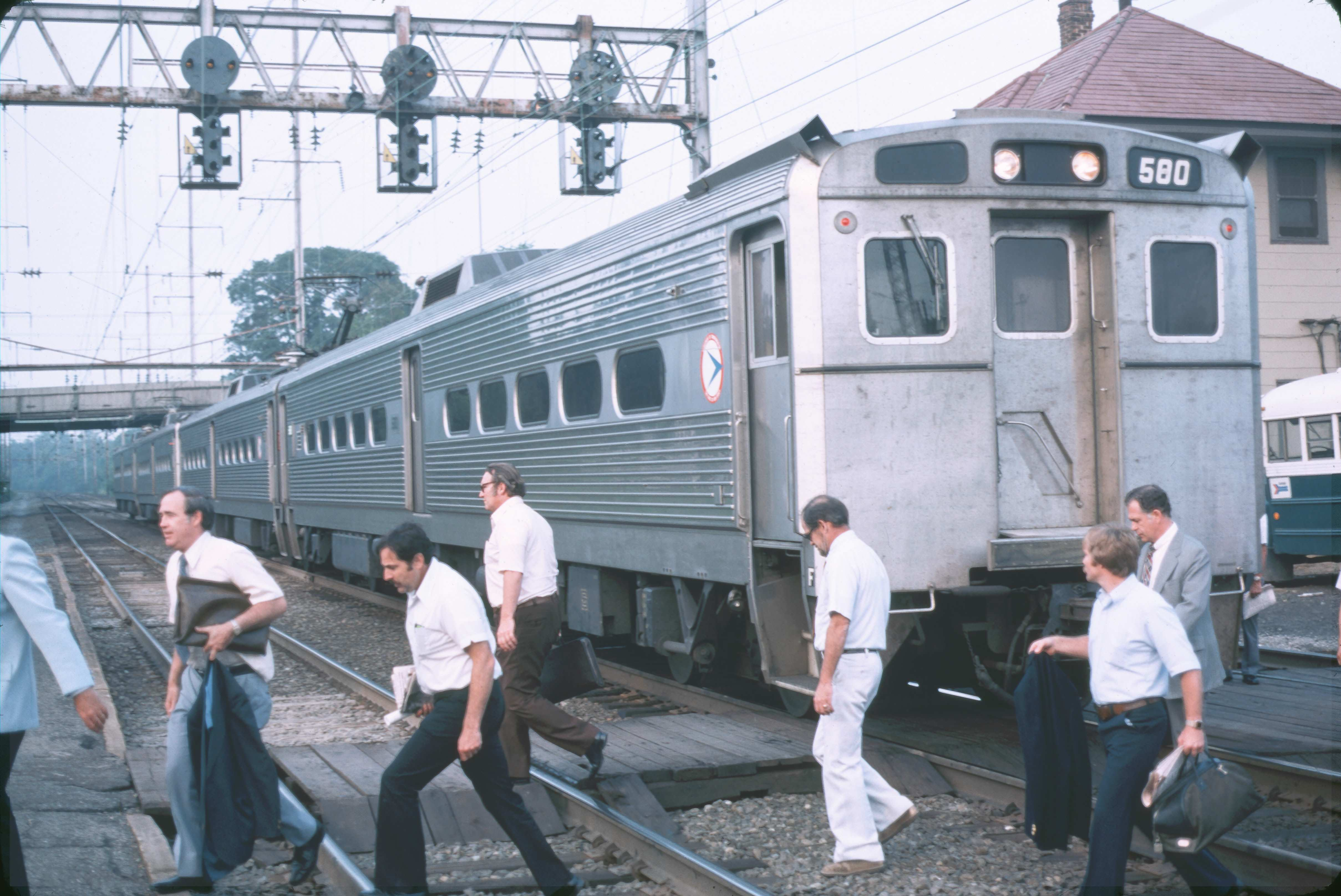
Arrow II cars at Bowie in August 1978

In 1974, General Electric produced 70 Arrow II cars in the married pair format, classed MA-1G. These cars were built in GE's Erie (PA) shops with car shells from Avco. The Arrow IIs were numbered 534–603. They were purchased specifically to replace the ancient PRR MP54s, which were slowly phased out of New Jersey service in late 1977.

The Arrow IIs were constructed following the production of SEPTA's single unit Silverliner IVs, but prior to the Married Pair Silverliner IV units. Indeed, the Arrow II and the Silverliner IV share the same body shell, cab corner air scoops and single-arm Faiveley pantographs, with the primary differences being the shorter air intake hump on the roof, corresponding lack of dynamic brakes, and the inclusion of the high-level center door as on the Arrow I.

One important feature was the 2-2 seating, which was a result of passenger dissatisfaction with the 3-2 seating on the Arrow I. The Arrow IIs also featured a toilet in the B-car.

In service, the Arrow IIs were frequently leased to Amtrak for off-hour Clocker trains. From June 1978 until the summer of 1979, the Arrow IIs were leased to the Maryland Department of Transportation, where they bumped the last operating MP54s from service. Cars 590-591 were heavily damaged in a collision at Seabrook, Maryland on June 9, 1978, early in their service in Maryland, but were later returned to service. From late 1979 until 1982, the Arrow IIs were loaned to Amtrak and were used for Silverliner Service and off-peak Clockers.

Upon the formation of NJ Transit, the Arrow IIs were called back to New Jersey. The Arrow IIs had been well worn during their time with Amtrak, and required a thorough overhaul.

Work began at Morrison Knudsen in January 1983, with the cars receiving several upgrades for compatibility with the Arrow IIIs. Almost every part was rebuilt or upgraded, including brakes, couplers, motors, gearboxes, and electrical gear. Among some of the noticeable changes, the 2-2 seats were replaced with 3-2 seats, increasing the capacity of the A-car from 100 to 119, and the B car from 96 to 113. In addition, the B-car featured a fold up handicap seat. The toilets were also rebuilt. The sliding doors were rebuilt to be compatible with Arrow III circuitry, and to be sensitive to objects they encounter when closing. The window glass was replaced with polycarbonate glazing. End strobes, new marker lights and a new pilot were installed on the cab ends, and the key operated locks were all standardized to match the Erie Lackawanna coach keys as used on the Arrow III. Finally, the main transformers were cleaned of PCBs and replaced with an EPA approved substitute.

The cars were renumbered to 1234–1303, and repainted for NJ Transit as they were out-shopped from late 1983 through 1984.

The Arrow IIs briefly returned to service on the Newark Division, but were ultimately reassigned to the Hoboken Division for the rest of their service lives. In 1997, the decision was made to retire them due to rotting floors and holes in the roofs, with ALP44s and Comet IV coaches (ordered for Midtown Direct service) in push-pull configuration as replacements. Most were scrapped in 2001. Pair 1236–1237, renumbered to 601–602, remains (however split) as part of SEPTA's wire inspection train.

== Arrow III ==
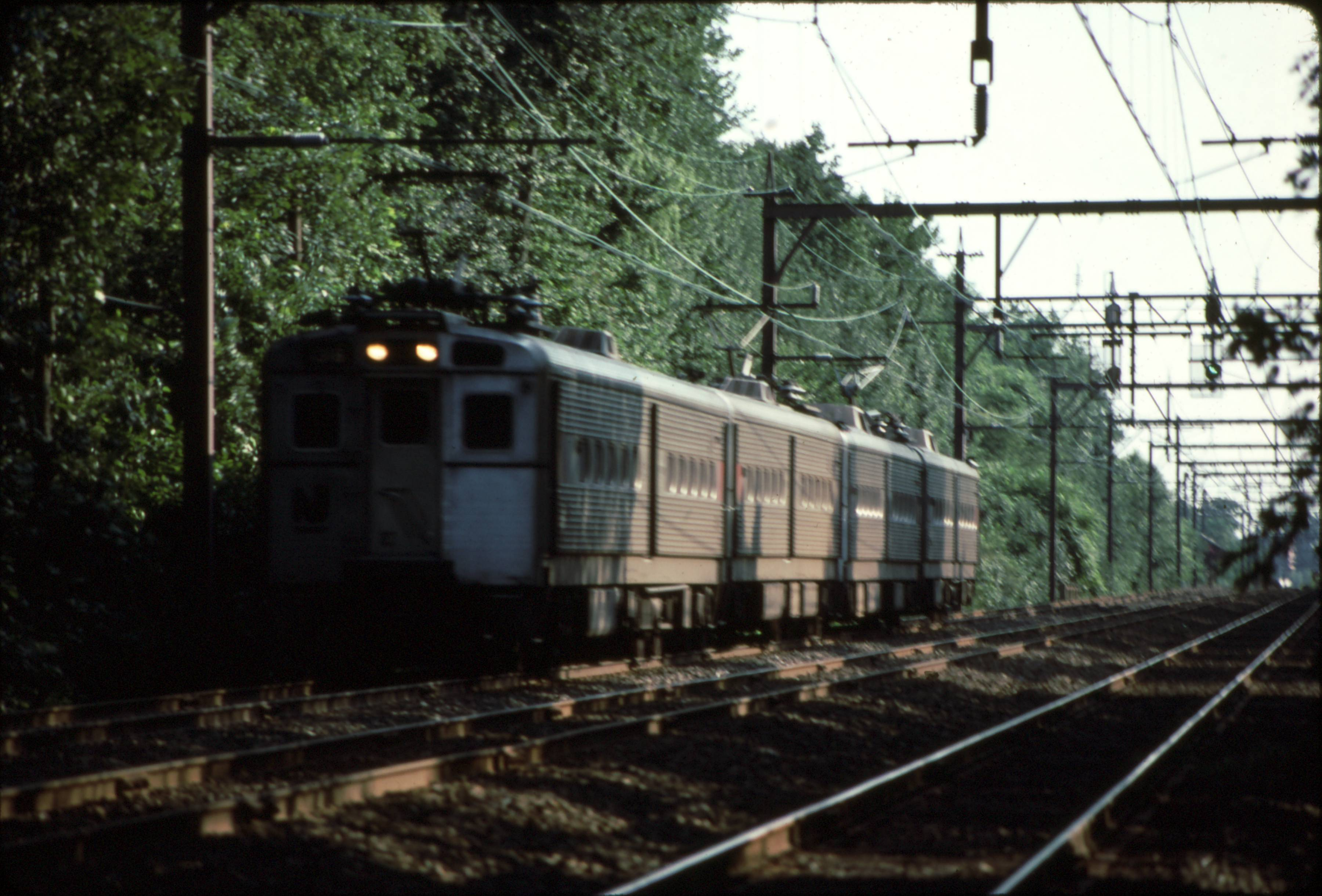
A mixed train of Arrow cars at South Orange in 1986, with two Arrow III single units leading and one 2-car Arrow II unit following.

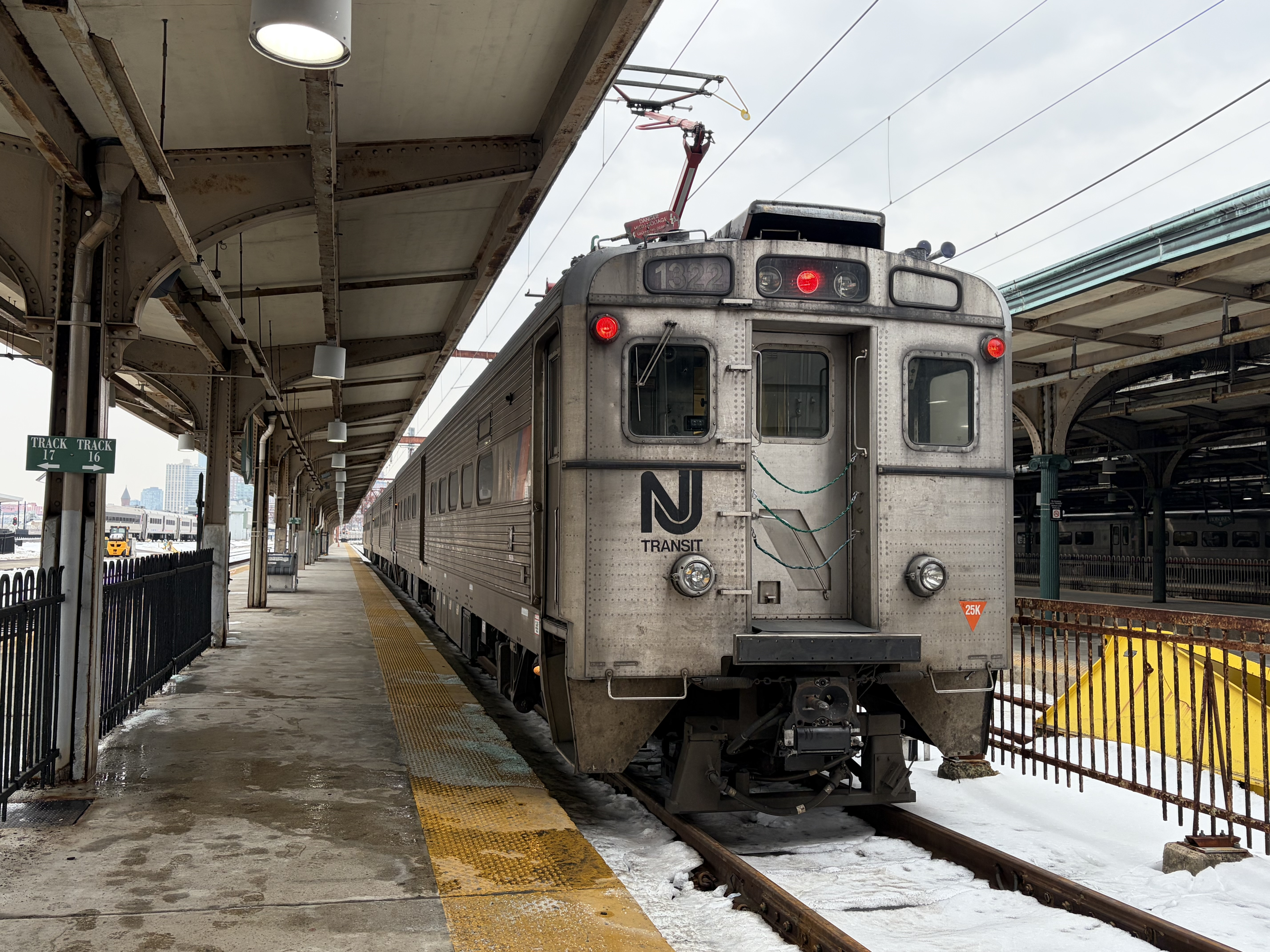
NJ Transit Arrow III #1322 idle at Hoboken Terminal

The Arrow IIIs were built in 1977 and 1978 by General Electric in the same fashion as the Arrow IIs. They consist of 200 cars built as married pairs (1334–1533) and 30 single cars (1304–1333). The single car units are classed as MA-1J, married pairs are classed as MA-1H. These cars were initially ordered as part of a plan to rehabilitate the NJDOT (Later NJ Transit's) Hoboken division, converting the 3,000 volt DC system to a 25 Kv 60 Hz AC system. However, due to the retirement of the Arrow I MUs, and the Arrow IIs frequently being leased to Amtrak and MARC, as well as delays to the rehabilitation of the Hoboken electrification, the Arrow IIIs were assigned to the former Penn Central electrified lines instead. As a result, the Arrow IIs and only a portion of the Arrow III fleet were devoted to the Hoboken division when the electrification work was finally finished in 1984, with the remaining Arrow IIIs being assigned as the only MUs in service on the Northeast Corridor and North Jersey Coast Line. Due to the lack of an automatic transformer tap changer, the Arrow IIIs cannot switch between line voltages while in service. To prevent confusion, a triangular orange sticker is affixed under the front window of each car, with the current voltage the unit is set to: "12K" for the Newark Division and "25K" for the Hoboken Division. After the North Jersey Coast Line was changed to 25 kV south of Matawan, MU service to Long Branch was replaced by push-pull trainsets only.

The Arrow III's body shell is similar to the Silverliner IV and Arrow II. However, the Arrow IIIs have some prominent differences, notably the two small air intake blisters (as opposed to the large humps on prior models). The Arrow IIIs also featured the twin-arm Stemmann pantographs as on the Arrow Is, built by the United Knitting Machine corporation. These were replaced with single arm TransTech type pantographs between 2011 and 2014. The large central air scoop over the center of the roof on each cab end is the final major spotting feature. Additionally, the Arrow IIIs saw the return of 3-2 seating.

The Arrow IIIs were given a mid-life overhaul between 1992 and 1995 by ABB. The rebuild replaced the original DC propulsion system with a new solid state 3-phase AC 4-pole asynchronous propulsion system using GTO thyristor technology and VVVF inverter control that also included higher power traction motors with a total of about 375 hp per two axle truck. The increased power per motor allowed for motors to be eliminated from the truck located on the cab-end of the pantograph car in each of the married pairs, reducing the number of powered axles per pair to 6 although raising horsepower to 1125. Single units retained all 4 powered axles with a total of 750 hp. After the rebuild was completed, problems were encountered with both traction motor and axle bearing overheating which lowered the maximum permitted speed in service from 100 mph (160 km/h) to 90 mph (140 km/h) and, later, 80 mph (130 km/h).

=== Prolonged service, other modifications, and future retirement ===
During the late 1990s, New Jersey Transit experimented with digital signage on the Arrow IIIs. The digital signage consisted of two backlit LCD screens per car, one on the bonnet of the train above the conductor's window, and the other in place of the 4 digit scrolling number boards on the right hand side of the unit, above the side passenger window closest to the cab door. The modifications proved troublesome operationally, and its use was abandoned in the following decades. Two Arrow IIIs were also retrofitted with experimental automated announcements as a pilot program in the 1990s. In 1998, Arrow IIIs began receiving ditchlights in response to an FRA mandate.

An Arrow III EMU sporting Penn Central decals departs Newark Penn Station, heading east for New York

NJ Transit currently operates three Arrow IIIs (one single and one married pair) with heritage liveries, making them one of the few passenger railroads in North America to operate heritage EMUs. In September of 2024, NJ TRANSIT applied Lackawanna heralds to the 1319 in remembrance of the 40th anniversary of the retirement of the famed Lackawanna MU cars. In February of 2025, married pair consisting of cars 1502 and 1503 were decorated with Penn Central "mating worms" on the front and sides, and NJDOT decals in the style of the original Jersey Arrow I cars. Additionally, the number boards were replaced with ones similar to those used by the Penn Central.

Between the years of 2018 and 2020, Arrow IIIs began to receive PTC modifications from Alstom, to comply with an FRA mandate that required all passenger trains to be equipped with PTC by 2020.

As of 2026, New Jersey Transit uses Arrow IIIs extensively on the Morris & Essex Lines (Hoboken to/from Gladstone or Dover/Summit), the Montclair-Boonton Line (Montclair State University to/from Hoboken), the Princeton Branch (Dinky) shuttle, the Northeast Corridor Line (New York to/from Jersey Avenue/Trenton, usually the former), and on rare occasions, the North Jersey Coast Line (New York to/from Rahway or Matawan). Excluding the Princeton Branch, Arrow IIIs can be found operating with as few as three cars on Gladstone trains as well as Bay Street weekend shuttles, and as many as twelve car trains on the Newark Division, dubbed "Titanic" by crews.

During the later years of Arrow III's service, New Jersey Transit had considerations to replace all Arrow IIIs with self-propelled railcars similar in design of the Bombardier Multilevel coach. In December 2018, a contract was awarded to Bombardier for 113 new electric multiple unit coaches, designated as MultiLevel III; 58 units with AC electric propulsion systems and 55 unpowered cars. The contract included options for up to 636 more cars for NJ Transit, as well as options for 250 cars for SEPTA Regional Rail if fully exercised.
