= Lenox station (Massachusetts) =

Lenox
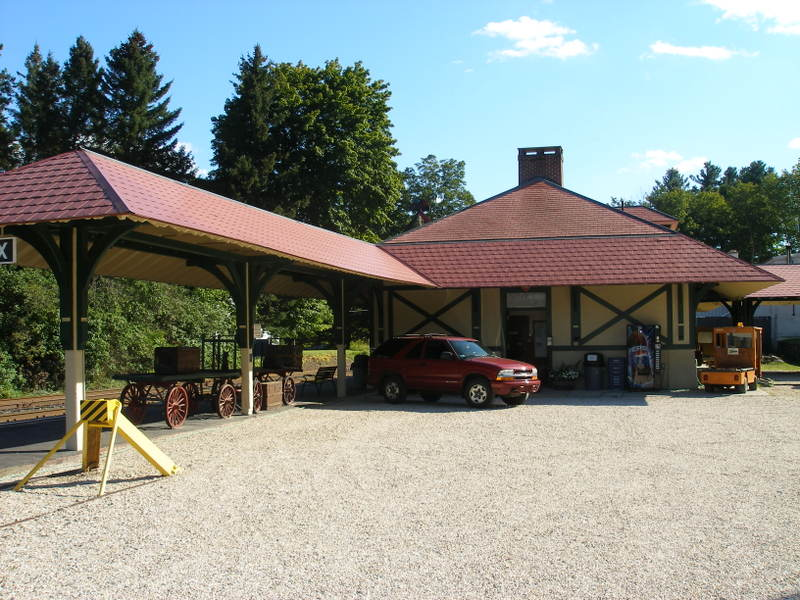
- Lenox station and the Berkshire Scenic Railway Museum

General information
- Location: 10 Willow Creek Road; Lenox, Massachusetts
- Coordinates: 42°21′1″N 73°14′44″W

Former services
Preceding station	New York, New Haven and Hartford Railroad	Following station
Lee toward Norwalk and South Norwalk	Pittsfield Branch	Pittsfield Terminus
- Lenox Railroad Station
- U.S. National Register of Historic Places
- Built: 1902
- Architect: James Clifford's Sons
- Architectural style: Tudor Revival
- NRHP reference No.: 89000225
- Added to NRHP: June 16, 1989
Location

Lenox station is a former Housatonic Railroad train station in Lenox, Massachusetts. Built in 1902, it served as the town's railroad station, on a line of the New York, New Haven and Hartford Railroad, until 1970. Now home to the Berkshire Scenic Railway Museum, it serves as a stop on the heritage railroad service provided by the museum. It was listed on the National Register of Historic Places in 1989 as Lenox Railroad Station.

== Description and history ==
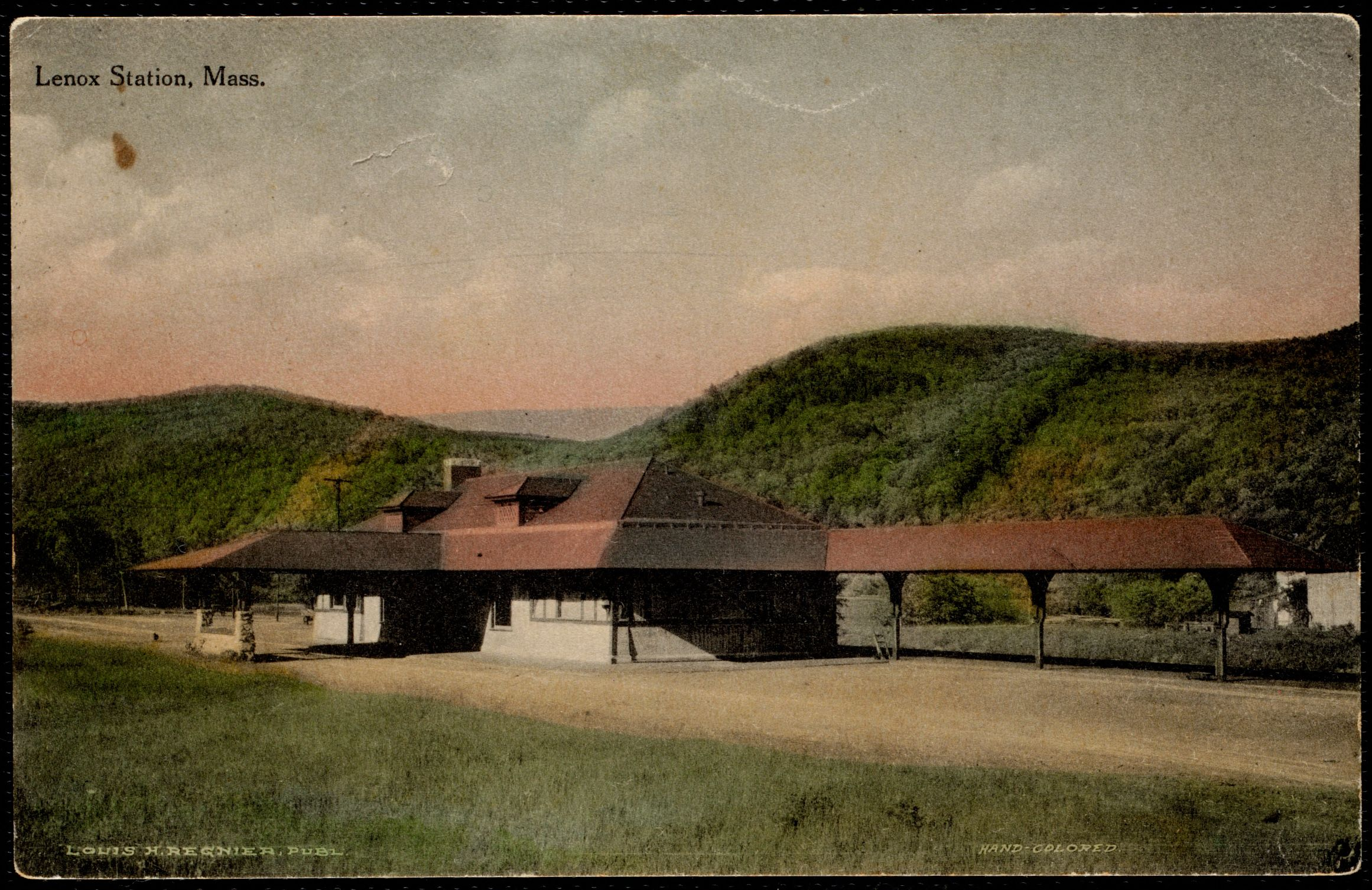
Early-20th-century postcard of the station

The former Lenox Railroad Station is located in eastern Lenox, at the northeast corner of Housatonic Road and Willow Creek Road. The railroad tracks run between the station and Woods Pond, a wide bulge in the Housatonic River. The station itself is 1 1/2 stories in height, with attached covered passenger shelters extending along the platform to the north and south. The station is Tudor Revival in style, with a stucco and false half-timbered exterior.

The station was built in 1902 by the New York, New Haven and Hartford Railroad (or New Haven Railroad), replacing the one that had been built around 1850 by the Stockbridge & Pittsfield Railroad and which had burned to the ground the previous year. It is architecturally unusual in the region, where the Tudor Revival was not commonly seen in railroad station architecture. The station and line were acquired by the Housatonic Railroad, which became the Berkshire Division of the New Haven Railroad in 1892.

From 1937 the Tanglewood hosted summer music events five miles to the west of the station. In peak mid-20th century years of passenger service, the Berkshire, Housatonic, Litchfield, Mahaiwe, Mahkeenac, Taconic, Umpachanee, and unnamed trains on the New Haven's Berkshire Division made stops at the station on trips between New York City and Pittsfield. The station went out of full year service in 1958; thereafter, trains made stops at the station only from May 26 to October 26. The last summer of passenger service was 1970, prior to Amtrak's assuming the Penn Central's operation of intercity trains on May 1, 1971. It now serves as the home of the Berkshire Scenic Railway Museum.

== See also ==
- National Register of Historic Places listings in Berkshire County, Massachusetts
