= Erie Lackawanna Railway =

American transport company

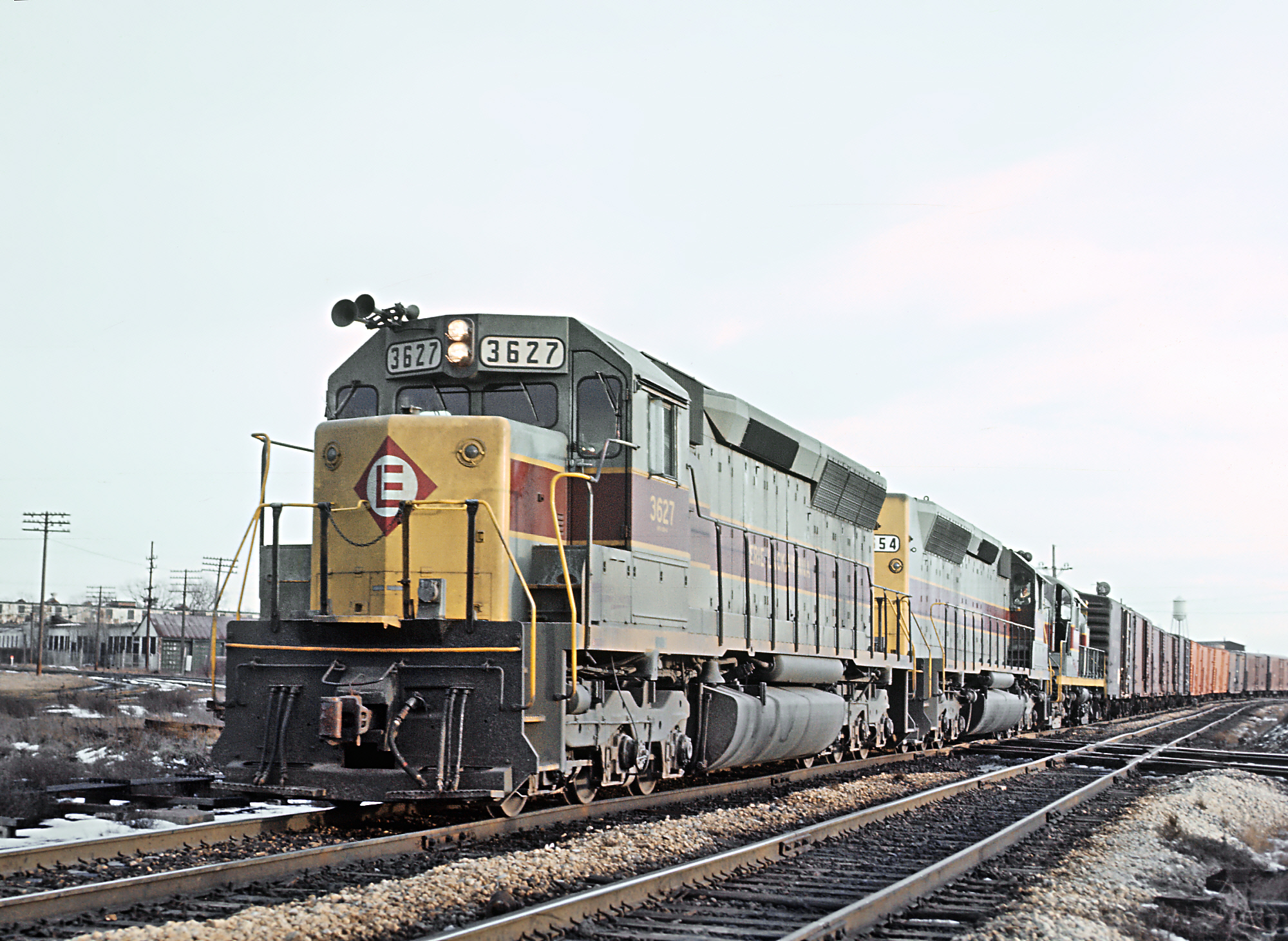
- An Erie Lackawanna train passes State Line Tower on the Indiana-Illinois border en route to Chicago in January, 1972

Overview
- Headquarters: Cleveland, Ohio
- Reporting mark: EL
- Locale: New Jersey; Pennsylvania; New York; Ohio; Indiana; Illinois
- Dates of operation: 1960–1976
- Predecessor: Delaware, Lackawanna & Western Railroad; Erie Railroad
- Successor: Conrail (now Norfolk Southern and CSX)

Technical
- Track gauge: 4 ft 8 1/2 in (1,435 mm) standard gauge
- Length: 3,189 miles (5,132 kilometers)

The Erie Lackawanna Railway (reporting mark EL), known as the Erie Lackawanna Railroad until 1968, was formed from the 1960 merger of the Erie Railroad and the Delaware, Lackawanna & Western Railroad. The official motto of the line was "The Friendly Service Route".

Like many railroads in the northeast already financially vulnerable from the expanding U.S. Interstate Highway System, the line was severely weakened fiscally by the extent, duration and record flood levels due to Hurricane Agnes in 1972. It would never recover. Most of the corporation's holdings became part of Conrail in 1976, ending its sixteen years as an independent operating railroad company.

== History ==
=== Formation and early success ===
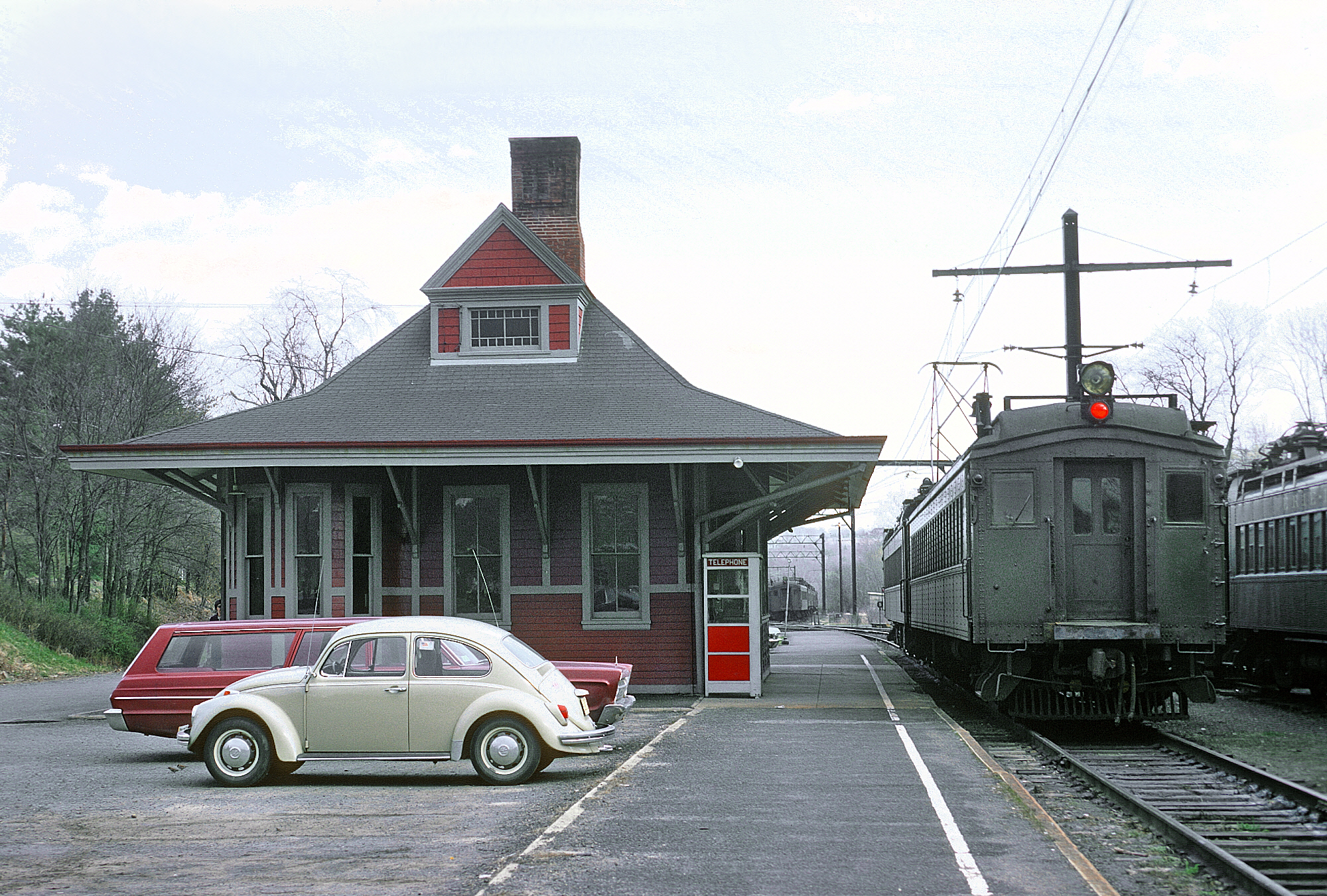
Erie Lackawanna MU cars at Gladstone station on April 25, 1970

The Interstate Commerce Commission approved the merger on Sept. 13, 1960, and on Oct. 17 the Erie Railroad and Delaware, Lackawanna and Western Railroad merged to form the Erie Lackawanna Railroad. The EL struggled for most of the 16 years it existed. The two railroads that created it were steadily losing passengers, freight traffic and money, and were heavily burdened by years of accumulated debt and extensive, money-losing commuter operations. These two historic lines, the Erie and the DL&W, started to consolidate facilities on the Hudson River waterfront and across southern New York State in 1956, four years before formal corporate merger. The Lackawanna route was severely affected by the decline of anthracite and cement traffic from Pennsylvania by the late 1940s. The Erie was burdened by the continuing loss of high-tariff fruit and vegetable traffic from the western states into the New York City region as highways improved in the 1950s. Both lines were also affected by the opening of the Saint Lawrence Seaway in 1959, which allowed ocean-going cargo ships to travel between European, African and South American ports and cities on the Great Lakes, such as Buffalo, Cleveland, Detroit, Duluth, Chicago, etc. The DL&W had previously carried much traffic to and from ocean ships, having its own port facilities at Hoboken Terminal on the Hudson River.

The northeast's railroads, including the EL, were all beginning to decline because of over-regulation, subsidized highway and waterway competition, commuter operations and market saturation (i.e., too many railroad lines competing for what market was remaining). The closure in the 1960s of old multi-story factories in the eastern cities, followed by the decline of the domestic automobile and steel industry in the 1970s, eroded much of the EL's traditional traffic base. Also, due to government regulation policy formulated in the late 19th century, the EL and other railroads could not immediately abandon long-distance passenger runs, despite the fact that competition from airlines, bus lines and the private automobile made them unprofitable.

However, the EL did post profits in the mid and late-1960s through heavy cost-cutting (reduction of parallel services), equipment modernization, suburban industrial development, increased piggy-back trailer traffic and steady reduction of long-distance passenger train service, which ended on January 6, 1970. Also, additional rail traffic was temporarily diverted to the EL because of service problems on the troubled Penn Central lines, which the EL largely paralleled. The EL built a state of the art diesel engine repair facility in Marion, Ohio, and upgraded a large car repair shop in Meadville, Pennsylvania. As to its money-losing suburban passenger train services in the New York City metropolitan region, the EL had come to terms with the state of New Jersey during the late 1960s for adequate subsidy and for the purchase of new engines and coaches. The EL also gained a lucrative contract with United Parcel Service in 1970, which led to the operation of five dedicated intermodal trains daily between New Jersey and Chicago.

=== Decline and conveyance into Conrail ===
The Erie Lackawanna Railway was formed on March 1, 1968, as a subsidiary of Dereco, the holding company of the Norfolk and Western Railway, which had bought the railroad. On April 1, the assets were transferred as a condition of the proposed but never-consummated merger between the N&W and Chesapeake and Ohio Railway. Dereco also owned the Delaware & Hudson Railway at the time.

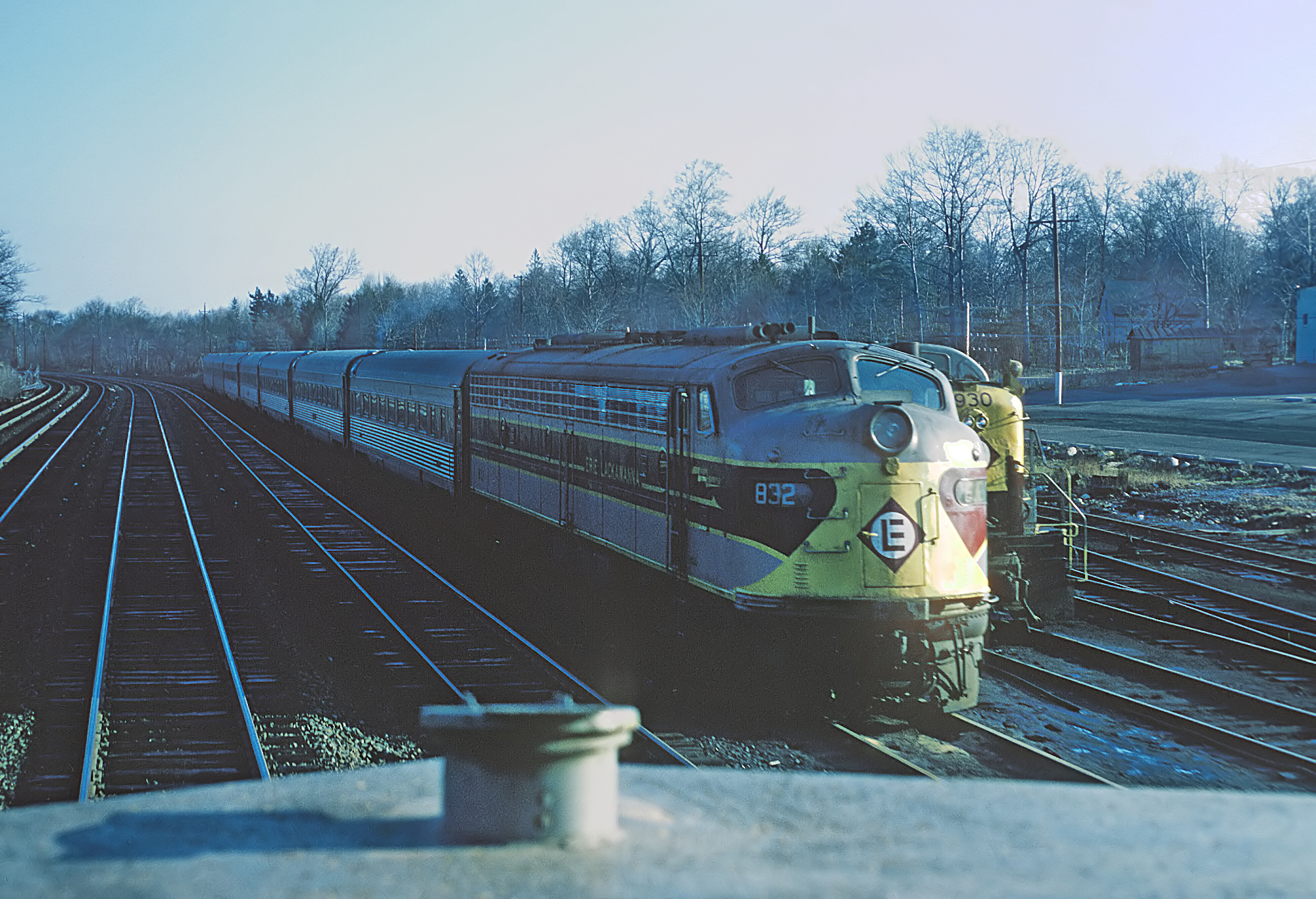
Trains at the Erie Lackawanna rail yard in Waldwick, New Jersey on April 25, 1970

In 1972, Hurricane Agnes destroyed many miles of track and related assets, especially in northeastern Pennsylvania and New York State's Southern Tier. The cost of repairs, and the loss of revenue, forced the company into bankruptcy, filing for reorganization under Section 77 of the Federal Bankruptcy Act on June 26. The completion of the Interstate 80 highway across Pennsylvania and New Jersey by 1971 added to the Erie Lackawanna's financial problems, as it diverted piggyback traffic previously garnered from less than truckload shipping companies such as Navajo and Cooper-Jarrett.

EL was able, however, to land large contracts with UPS because of its ability to move piggyback traffic between Chicago and the New York metropolitan area more reliably, although not faster than Penn Central (and formerly, New York Central). For example, in 1971, the Penn Central advertised a 24 and 1/2 hour piggyback service from Metro New York to Metro Chicago in the Official Guide of the Railways, while the EL's Employees Timetable Number 3, New York Division, showed its fastest comparable schedule to be 28 hours and 45 minutes. By 1973, the Penn Central's fastest piggyback service between these points was shown in the Official Guide to be 26 hours and 15 minutes, while the EL's Employees Timetable Number 4 showed that the EL's fastest comparable schedule was 29 and 1/2 hours.

After its 1972 bankruptcy, EL management attempted to plot an independent course, anticipating financial reorganization without a heavy debt burden. Therefore, it initially declined interest in joining the Consolidated Rail Corporation (Conrail) takeover of the other major bankrupt eastern lines. The preliminary (PSP) and final (FSP) system plans for Conrail showed the EL being merged into the Chessie System. Also, by 1975, the economy in the eastern United States was gravely affected by the 1973 oil crisis, quashing any hopes of the EL being able to independently compete with government-rehabilitated Conrail lines. Therefore, the EL petitioned and was accepted into Conrail at the last minute.

In 1976, much of the company's railroad assets were thus purchased by the federal government and combined with other companies' railroad assets to form Conrail. An independent Erie Lackawanna Estate continued in existence for several years thereafter. This estate liquidated the EL's marginal non-railroad assets and distributed the railroad purchase funds to satisfy much of the large debt burden that the EL and its predecessors had accumulated. The EL's creditors gained more by selling the line's assets than by continuing its traditional business operations.

=== Remaining service today ===
The Erie Lackawanna's former commuter services are operated by NJ Transit and Metro-North; non-electrified service operates to and from Hoboken Terminal; electrified lines use both Hoboken Terminal and Pennsylvania Station as terminals. Metro-North and NJ Transit share operation of the Port Jervis and Pascack Valley Lines, while NJ Transit operates the Main, Montclair-Boonton, Morristown, Bergen County, and Gladstone Lines.

Track reconstruction is underway that could restore regular service along the Lackawanna Cut-Off from Port Morris Junction, New Jersey to the Pennsylvania border at the Delaware River (28.45 miles) and extend service into northeastern Pennsylvania, possibly as far as Scranton.

The Erie portion of the original Mainline between Port Jervis and Binghamton is operated by the CNYK. The Lackawanna Railroad mainline west of Portland is operated by the Delaware-Lackawanna Railroad to Scranton; then by Norfolk Southern north to Binghamton. Norfolk Southern also operates from Binghamton to Buffalo on the Erie mainline, with the former Chicago mainline that heads west at Hornell operated by the Western New York and Pennsylvania Railroad. Most trackage in Ohio, Indiana and Illinois is a thing of the past.

== Operations ==
=== Noted passenger trains ===
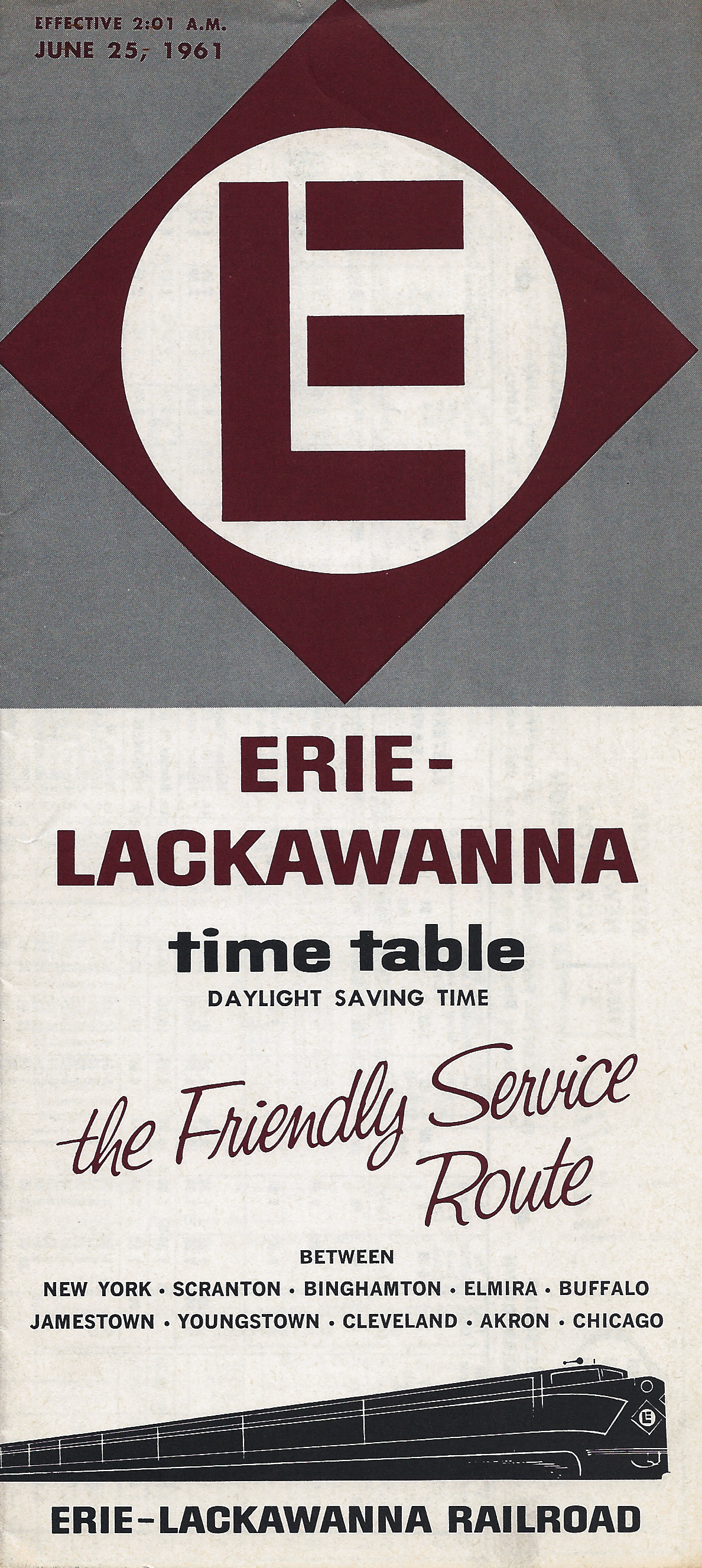
The cover of Erie Lackawanna Railroad Company's Form 1, including a timetable of the "Friendly Service Route" between New York City and Scranton, Pennsylvania, Binghamton, Elmira, and Buffalo in New York state, Jamestown, Youngstown, Cleveland, Akron in Ohio), and Chicago in Illinois

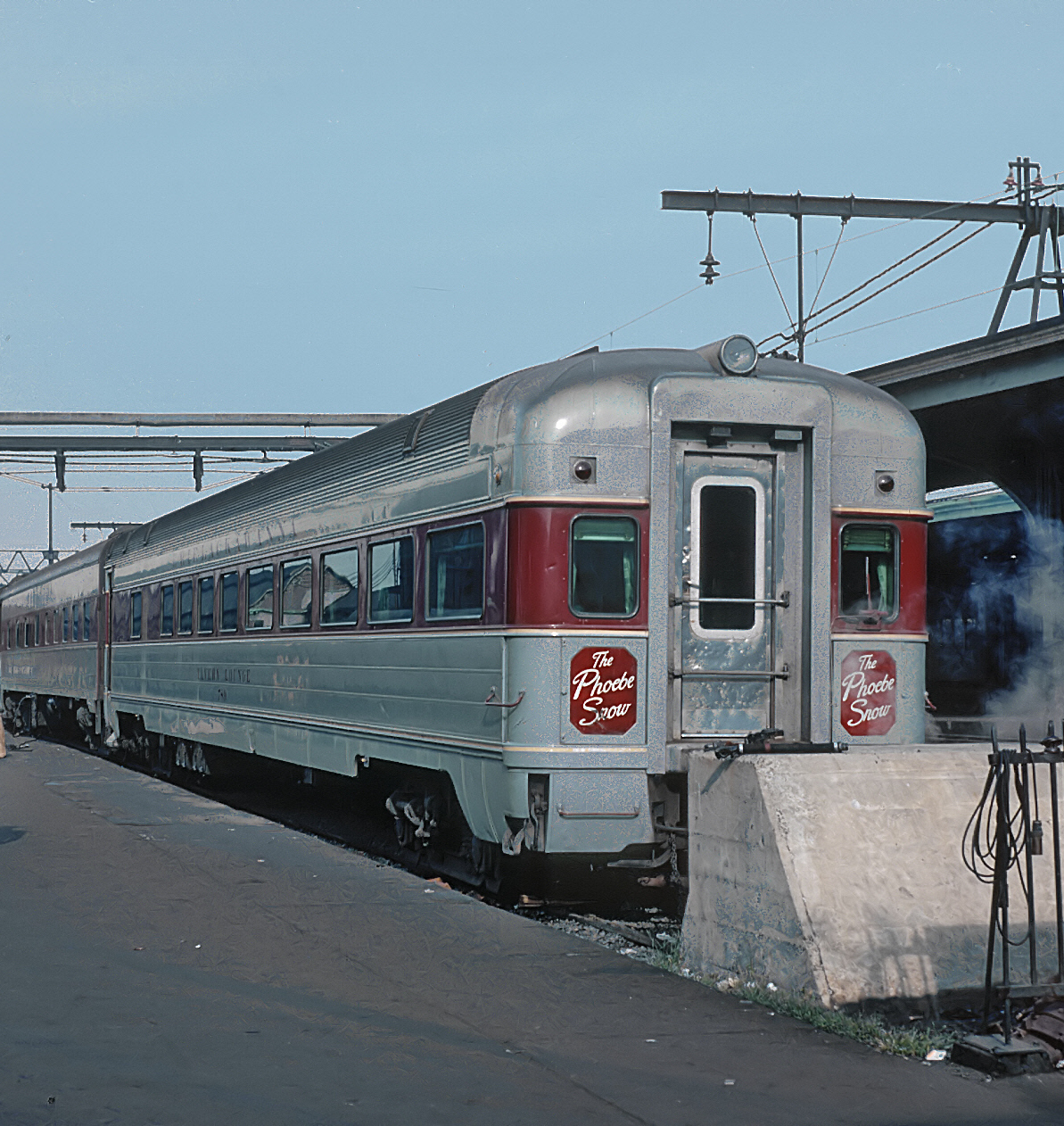
The Phoebe Snow at Hoboken Terminal in September 1965

- Nos. 1 and 2, Phoebe Snow, New York (Hoboken)-Chicago; discontinued November 27–28, 1966.
- No. 7, Pacific Express, No. 8 the Atlantic Express; discontinued in August 1965.
- Nos. 5 and 6, Lake Cities, discontinued January 5–6, 1970.
- No. 10, New York Mail; No. 15, Owl; discontinued May 23, 1969.
- Nos. 28/29, Cleveland-Youngstown commuter trains; discontinued January 14, 1977. Though operated by Conrail after April 1976, they were the last remnant of EL passenger trains outside the New York-New Jersey commuter zone. These trains used the same EL locomotives and coaches formerly used on through mainline passenger trains.
- No. 40, Pocono Express; No. 43, Twilight, trains that made local stops throughout the resort Pocono Mountains region, discontinued Fall, 1965.
- Nos. 623, Morning Steel King, and 624, Evening Steel King, pool train with NYC, P&LE and B&O railroads, from Toledo to Washington, D.C., via Cleveland, Youngstown and Pittsburgh; discontinued by 1962.

== Heritage units ==
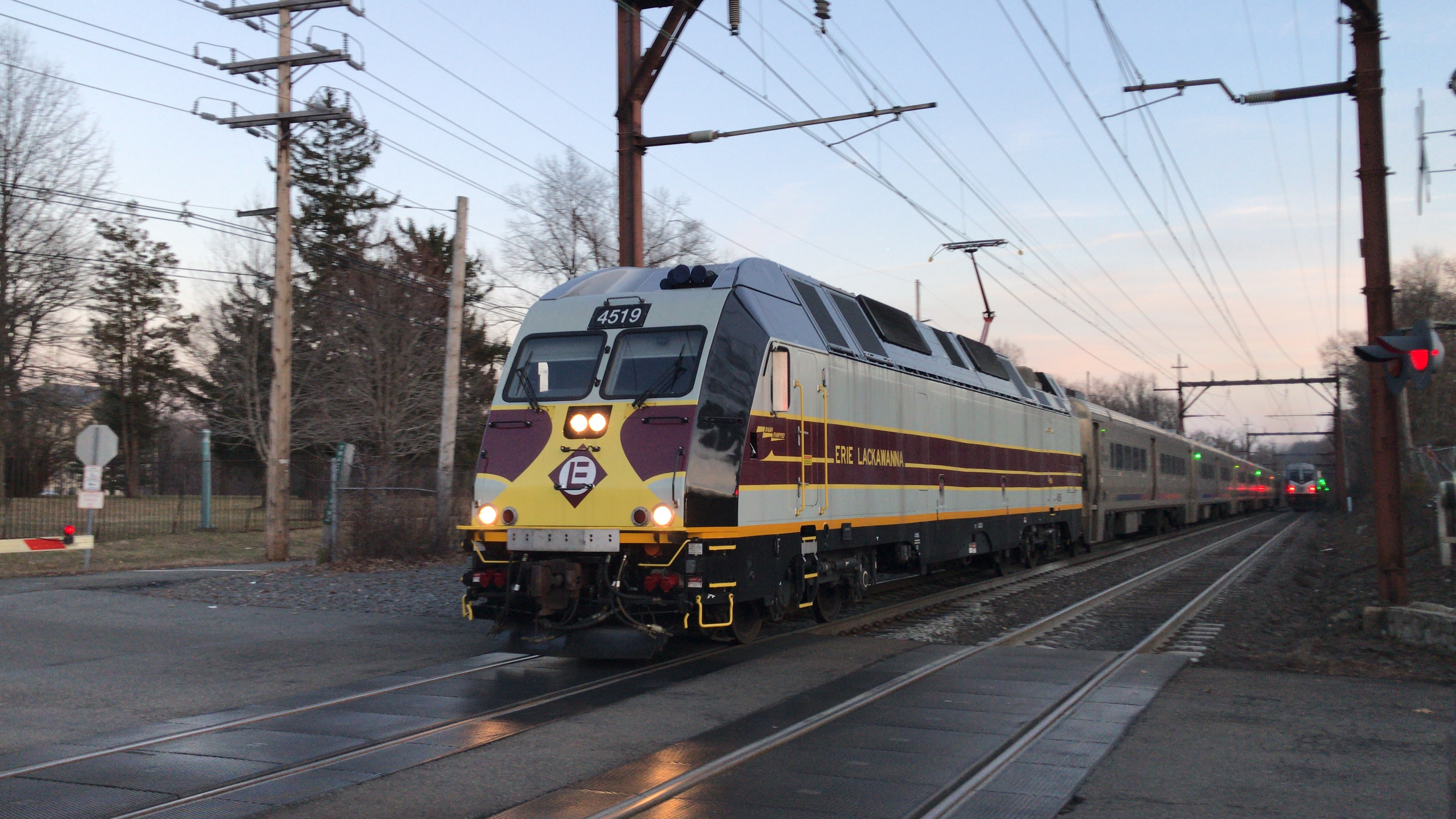
NJ Transit's Erie Lackawanna Heritage Unit 4519 entering Convent Station in Convent Station, New Jersey

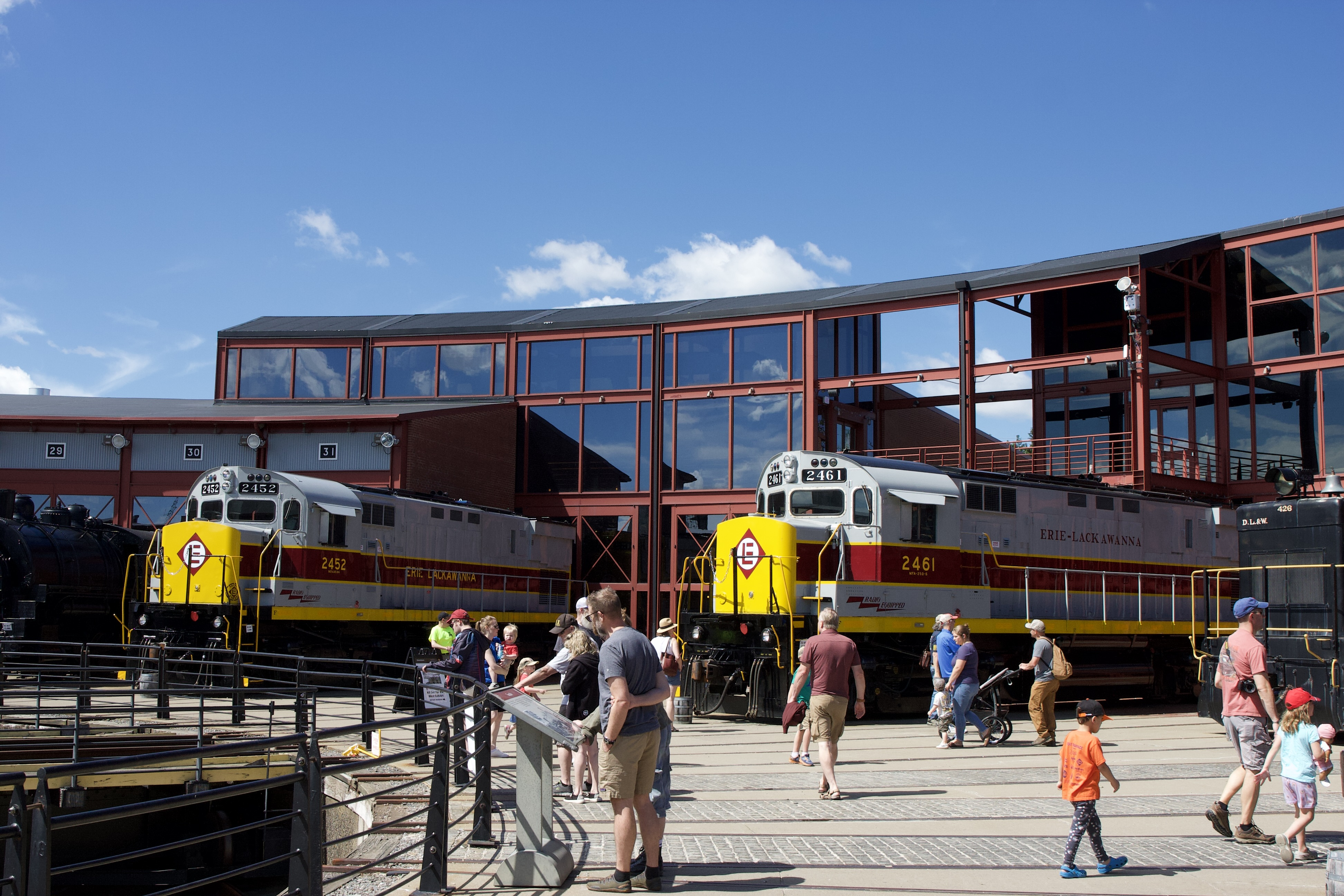
DL C425 heritage units at Scranton, Pennsylvania in June 2026

In September 2015, Norfolk Southern revealed EMD SD45-2 1700, which had been painted back to its as-built Erie Lackawanna color scheme at Chattanooga, Tennessee. This is the second unit from an NS predecessor painted back into its original colors. In 2019, as part of its 40th anniversary, New Jersey Transit wrapped ALP-45DP 4519 and a Bombardier MultiLevel Coach into Erie Lackawanna colors. In 2025, the Delaware-Lackawanna Railroad repainted two of its former Erie Lackawanna ALCO C425 nos. 2452 and 2461 into the Erie Lackawanna paint scheme, with 2461 getting the "early" livery with the name being above the stripe and 2452 getting the "late" livery with the name being within the stripe.

== See also ==
- Erie Lackawanna Trail
- Lackawanna Cut-Off
