= Berkshire Scenic Railway Museum =

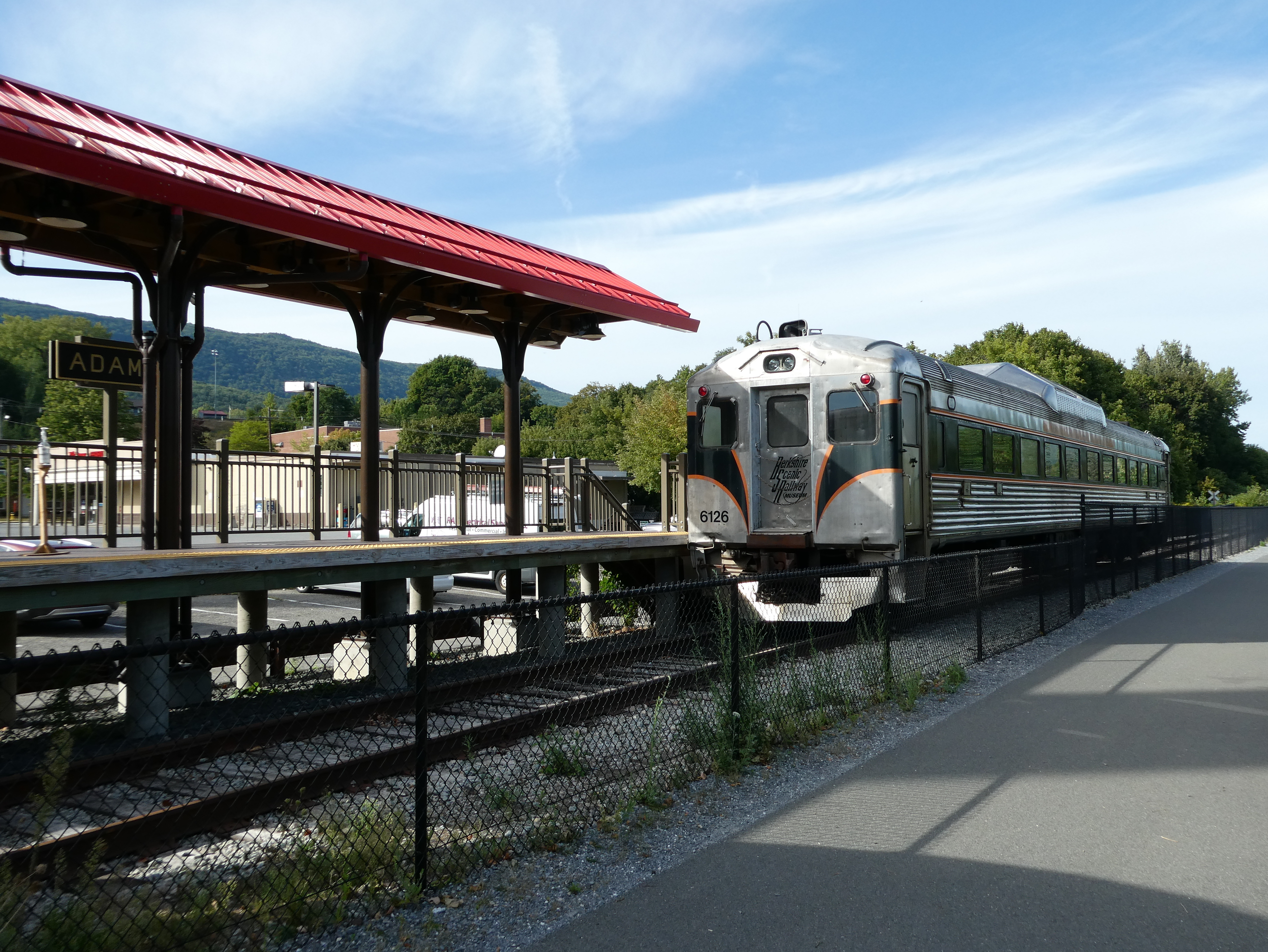
- Budd RDC #6126 at the Adams station in 2022
- Established: 1984
- Location: 4 Hoosac Street, Adams, Massachusetts
- Coordinates: 42.625227°N 73.117057°W
- Type: Railway museum
- Website: www.berkshiretrains.org

The Berkshire Scenic Railway Museum (reporting mark BRMX) is a railroad museum located in Lenox, Massachusetts, United States that offers historical exhibits. The museum was founded in 1984 as a not-for-profit organization. During the 1980s and 2003–2011, it offered tourist train rides between Lenox and Stockbridge on the Housatonic Railroad right-of-way. In 2016 the museum began tourist train service in North Adams, Massachusetts.

== History ==
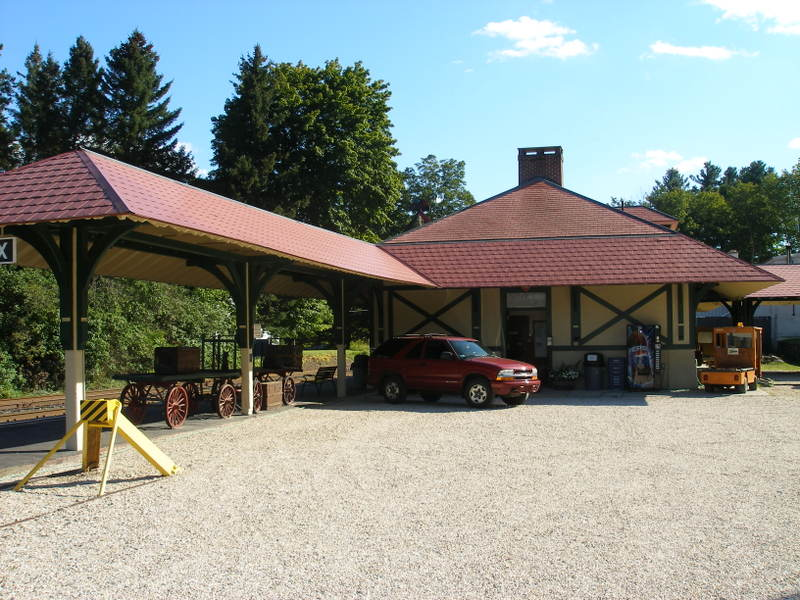
Lenox station, the railroad's base of operations from 2003 to 2011

In 1984 the Berkshire Scenic Railway Museum began operating passenger excursions between Lee and Great Barrington, over tracks owned by the Housatonic Railroad. Due to deteriorating track conditions, passenger operations were suspended after several years. The excursion trains returned in 2003, based at the restored station in Lenox, with regular schedules to Lee and Stockbridge. At the end of 2011, the Housatonic declined to renew the state operating lease used by the museum.

In 2014, the museum received a $200,000 state grant to move its excursion train operations to the Hoosac Valley, operating between Adams and North Adams. The Town of Adams spent $500,000 renovating a former car wash into a railroad station. MassDOT purchased the northern portion of the Adams Branch from Pan Am Railways and restored the first 4 miles (6.4 km) south from North Adams.

In November 2015, the City of North Adams completed an agreement to lease land for a temporary passenger platform for the line. Service began in May 2016, departing from North Adams. A $2.6 million MassDOT grant funded construction of a permanent platform in downtown Adams and construction of the remaining 1 mile (1.6 km) of track. The track work was completed in late 2017, and excursion service began operating from Adams in 2018.
