= List of Massachusetts railroads =

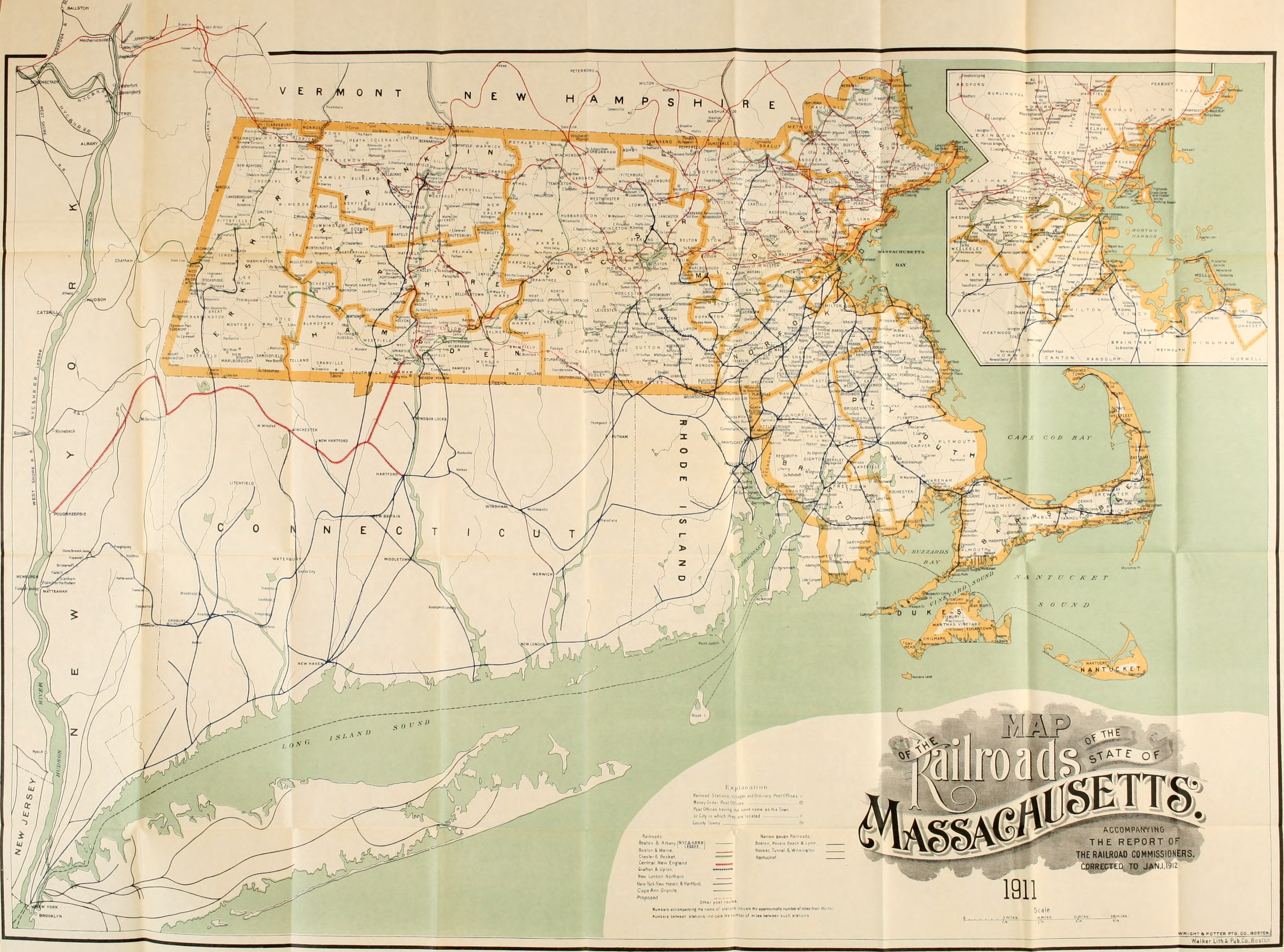
A 1911 map showing approximately the maximum extent of Massachusetts railroads

The following railroads operate in the U.S. state of Massachusetts.

== Common freight carriers ==
- Connecticut Southern Railroad (CSO) (Genesee and Wyoming)
- CSX Transportation (CSXT)
- East Brookfield & Spencer Railroad (EBSR)
- Fore River Transportation Corporation (FRVT)
- Grafton and Upton Railroad (GU)
- Housatonic Railroad (HRRC)
- Massachusetts Central Railroad (MCER)
- Massachusetts Coastal Railroad (MC)
- New England Central Railroad (NECR) (Genesee and Wyoming)
- Pan Am Railways (PAR)
- Pan Am Southern (PAS) (Operated by Pan Am Railways)
- Pioneer Valley Railroad (PVRR) (Pinsly)
- Providence and Worcester Railroad (PW) (Genesee and Wyoming)

== Passenger carriers ==
- Amtrak (AMTK)
- Berkshire Scenic Railway (BRMX)
- Cape Cod Central Railroad (CCCR)
- Edaville Railroad
- Massachusetts Bay Transportation Authority (MBTX)
- Hartford Line (CNDX)

== Defunct railroads ==
Name	Mark	System (Note: This is one or more of the Class I railroads that the railroad became part of, if any.)	From	To	Successor	Notes
Agricultural Branch Railroad		NH	1847	1867	Boston, Clinton and Fitchburg Railroad	
Albany Street Freight Railway			1868		N/A	
Amherst and Belchertown Railroad		CN	1851	1858	Amherst, Belchertown and Palmer Railroad	
Amherst, Belchertown and Palmer Railroad		CN	1858	1861	New London Northern Railroad	
Andover and Haverhill Railroad		B&M	1837	1839	Boston and Portland Railroad	
Andover and Wilmington Railroad		B&M	1833	1837	Andover and Haverhill Railroad	
Asbury Grove Railroad		B&M	1870	1870	Eastern Railroad	
Ashburnham Railroad		B&M	1871	1885	Fitchburg Railroad	
Athol and Enfield Railroad		NYC	1869	1873	Springfield, Athol and North-eastern Railroad	
Bay Colony Railroad		BCLR	1982	2023	Massachusetts Coastal Railroad	
Barre and Worcester Railroad		B&M	1847	1849	Boston, Barre and Gardner Railroad	
Bellingham Branch Railroad		NH	1852	1853	New York and Boston Railroad	
Berkshire Railroad		NH	1837	1910	New York, New Haven and Hartford Railroad	
Billerica and Bedford Railroad		B&M	1876	1878	Boston and Lowell Railroad	
Boston and Albany Railroad	B&A	NYC	1867	1961	New York Central Railroad	
Boston, Barre and Gardner Railroad		B&M	1849	1885	Fitchburg Railroad	
Boston, Clinton and Fitchburg Railroad		NH	1867	1876	Boston, Clinton, Fitchburg and New Bedford Railroad	
Boston, Clinton, Fitchburg and New Bedford Railroad		NH	1873	1883	Old Colony Railroad	
Boston, Hartford and Erie Railroad		NH	1863	1874	New York and New England Railroad	
Boston, Hingham and Hull Railroad		NH	1880	1881	Nantasket Beach Railroad	
Boston and Lowell Railroad		B&M	1830	1919	Boston and Maine Railroad	
Boston and Maine Corporation	BM	B&M	1963			Still exists as a lessor of Pan Am Railways operating subsidiary Springfield Terminal Railway
Boston and Maine Railroad	B&M, BM	B&M	1841	1964	Boston and Maine Corporation	
Boston and Maine Railroad Extension Company		B&M	1844	1845	Boston and Maine Railroad	
Boston and New York Central Railroad		NH	1853	1858	Midland Railroad	
Boston and Portland Railroad		B&M	1839	1841	Boston and Maine Railroad	
Boston and Providence Railroad		NH	1831	1972	Penn Central Transportation Company	
Boston, Revere Beach and Lynn Railroad			1874	1940	N/A	
Boston Terminal Company	BTCO	NH	1896	1965	N/A	
Boston and Winthrop Railroad			1881	1883	Boston, Winthrop and Shore Railroad	
Boston, Winthrop and Point Shirley Railroad			1876	1883	Boston, Winthrop and Shore Railroad	
Boston, Winthrop and Shore Railroad			1883	1891	Boston, Revere Beach and Lynn Railroad	
Boston and Worcester Railroad		NYC	1831	1867	Boston and Albany Railroad	
Brookline and Pepperell Railroad		B&M	1891	1895	Fitchburg Railroad	
Cape Ann Granite Railroad			1894			
Cape Cod Railroad		NH	1854	1872	Old Colony Railroad	
Cape Cod Branch Railroad		NH	1846	1854	Cape Cod Railroad	
Cape Cod Central Railroad		NH	1861	1868	Cape Cod Railroad	
Central Massachusetts Railroad		B&M	1883	1901	Boston and Maine Railroad	
Central New England Railway	CNE	NH	1899	1938	N/A	
Central Vermont Railroad		CN	1873	1899	Central Vermont Railway	
Central Vermont Railway	CV	CN	1899	1995	New England Central Railroad	
Charles River Railroad		NH	1851	1855	New York and Boston Railroad	
Charles River Branch Railroad		NH	1849	1853	Charles River Railroad	
Charlestown Branch Railroad		B&M	1836	1846	Fitchburg Railroad	
Chatham Railroad		NH	1887	1937	N/A	
Chelsea Beach Railroad		B&M	1881	1892	Boston and Maine Railroad	
Chelsea Branch Railroad		NYC	1846	1847	Grand Junction Railroad and Depot Company	
Cheshire Railroad		B&M	1846	1890	Fitchburg Railroad	
Chester and Becket Railroad		NYC	1896	1931	N/A	
Commercial Freight Railway		NH	1866	1867	Marginal Freight Railway	
Concord Railroad		B&M	1856	1890	Concord and Montreal Railroad	
Concord and Montreal Railroad		B&M	1890	1895	Boston and Maine Corporation	
Connecticut Central Railroad		NH	1876	1887	New York and New England Railroad	
Connecticut River Railroad		B&M	1845	1919	Boston and Maine Railroad	
Connecticut Valley Railroad		NH	1876	1876	Connecticut Central Railroad	
Consolidated Rail Corporation	CR		1976	1999	CSX Transportation	
Danvers Railroad		B&M	1852	1906	Boston and Maine Railroad	
Danvers and Georgetown Railroad		B&M	1851	1855	Newburyport Railroad	
Deerfield River Company			1883	1888	Hoosac Tunnel and Wilmington Railroad	
Dighton and Somerset Railroad		NH	1863	1865	Old Colony and Newport Railway	
Dorchester and Milton Branch Railroad		NH	1846	1885	Old Colony Railroad	
Duxbury and Cohasset Railroad		NH	1867	1878	Old Colony Railroad	
East Boston Freight Railroad		NYC	1862	1869	Boston and Albany Railroad	
Eastern Railroad		B&M	1836	1890	Boston and Maine Railroad	
Eastern Junction, Broad Sound Pier and Point Shirley Railroad			1880	1883	Boston, Winthrop and Shore Railroad	
Easton Branch Railroad		NH	1854	1871	Old Colony and Newport Railway	
Essex Railroad		B&M	1846	1864	Eastern Railroad	
Essex Branch Railroad		B&M	1869	1872	Eastern Railroad	
Fairhaven Branch Railroad		NH	1849	1861	New Bedford and Taunton Railroad	
Fall River Railroad (1846)		NH	1846	1854	Old Colony and Fall River Railroad	
Fall River Railroad (1874)		NH	1874	1896	Old Colony Railroad	
Fall River Branch Railroad		NH	1844	1845	Fall River Railroad (1846)	
Fall River and Warren Railroad		NH	1857	1862	Fall River, Warren and Providence Railroad	
Fall River, Warren and Providence Railroad		NH	1862	1892	Old Colony Railroad	
Fitchburg Railroad		B&M	1842	1919	Boston and Maine Railroad	
Fitchburg and Worcester Railroad		NH	1846	1869	Boston, Clinton and Fitchburg Railroad	
Fore River Railroad	FOR		1919			Still exists as a lessor of the Fore River Transportation Corporation
Fore River Railway	FRY		1986	1992	Quincy Bay Terminal Company	
Foxborough Branch Railroad		NH	1862	1867	Mansfield and Framingham Railroad	
Framingham and Lowell Railroad		NH	1870	1881	Lowell and Framingham Railroad	
Georgetown Branch Railroad		B&M	1844	1846	Newburyport Railroad	
Grafton Centre Railroad			1873	1888	Grafton and Upton Railroad	
Grand Junction Railroad and Depot Company		NYC	1847	1862	East Boston Freight Railroad	
Granite Railway		NH	1826	1870	Old Colony and Newport Railway	
Greenfield and Fitchburg Railroad		B&M	1848	1848	Vermont and Massachusetts Railroad	
Greenfield and Northampton Railroad		B&M	1845	1845	Connecticut River Railroad	
Hampden Railroad		NH	1852	1853	Hampshire and Hampden Railroad	
Hampshire and Hampden Railroad		NH	1853	1862	New Haven and Northampton Company	
Hanover Branch Railroad		NH	1846	1887	Old Colony Railroad	
Hartford and Connecticut Western Railroad		NH	1889	1938	N/A	
Hartford and New Haven Railroad		NH	1847	1872	New York, New Haven and Hartford Railroad	
Hartford and Springfield Railroad		NH	1839	1847	Hartford and New Haven Railroad	
Harvard Branch Railroad			1848	1855	N/A	
Holyoke and Westfield Railroad		NH	1869	1976	Consolidated Rail Corporation	
Hoosac Tunnel and Wilmington Railroad	HTW		1886	1971	N/A	
Hopkinton Railroad		NH	1870	1884	Milford and Woonsocket Railroad	
Hopkinton Branch Railroad		NH	1869	1870	Hopkinton Railroad	
Hopkinton and Milford Railroad		NH	1867	1870	Hopkinton Railroad	
Horn Pond Branch Railroad		B&M	1852	1929		
Housatonic Railroad			1842	1892	New York, New Haven and Hartford Railroad	
Hull and Nantasket Beach Railroad		NH	1880	1881	Nantasket Beach Railroad	
Lancaster and Sterling Branch Railroad		B&M	1846	1846	Fitchburg Railroad	
Lexington and Arlington Railroad		B&M	1867	1870	Boston and Lowell Railroad	
Lexington and West Cambridge Railroad		B&M	1845	1867	Lexington and Arlington Railroad	
Lowell and Andover Railroad		B&M	1873	1919	Boston and Maine Railroad	
Lowell and Andover Railroad		B&M	1846	1848	Lowell and Lawrence Railroad	
Lowell and Framingham Railroad		NH	1881	1886	Old Colony Railroad	
Lowell and Lawrence Railroad		B&M	1848	1879	Boston and Lowell Railroad	
Manchester and Lawrence Railroad		B&M	1846	1856	Concord Railroad	
Mansfield and Framingham Railroad		NH	1867	1875	Boston, Clinton and Fitchburg Railroad	
Marblehead and Lynn Railroad		B&M	1865	1872	Eastern Railroad	
Marginal Freight Railway		NH	1867	1872	Union Freight Railroad	
Marlborough Branch Railroad		B&M	1852	1860	Marlborough and Feltonville Branch Railroad	
Marlborough and Feltonville Branch Railroad		B&M	1858	1862	Fitchburg Railroad	
Martha's Vineyard Railroad			1874	1892	N/A	
Massachusetts Central Railroad		B&M	1869	1883	Central Massachusetts Railroad	
Medford Branch Railroad		B&M	1845	1845	Boston and Maine Railroad Extension Company	
Medway Branch Railroad		NH	1849	1864	Boston, Hartford and Erie Railroad	
Middleborough Railroad		NH	1845	1845	Fall River Railroad (1846)	
Middleborough and Taunton Railroad		NH	1853	1874	Old Colony Railroad	
Middlesex Central Railroad		B&M	1871	1883	Boston and Lowell Railroad	
Midland Railroad		NH	1858	1862	Midland Land Damage Company	
Midland Railroad		NH	1850	1853	Boston and New York Central Railroad	
Midland Land Damage Company		NH	1861	1863	Southern Midland Railroad	
Milford, Franklin and Providence Railroad		NH	1882	1910	New York, New Haven and Hartford Railroad	
Milford and Woonsocket Railroad		NH	1855	1910	New York, New Haven and Hartford Railroad	
Monadnock Railroad		B&M	1869	1892	Fitchburg Railroad	
Mount Tom and Easthampton Railroad		B&M	1871	1872	Connecticut River Railroad	
Mystic River Railroad		B&M	1853	1871	Boston and Lowell Railroad	
Nantasket Beach Railroad		NH	1880	1906	Old Colony Railroad	
Nantucket Railroad			1910	1917	N/A	
Nantucket Railroad			1880	1894	Nantucket Central Railroad	
Nantucket Central Railroad			1895	1910	Nantucket Railroad	
Nashua and Acton Railroad		B&M	1907	1925	N/A	
Nashua, Acton and Boston Railroad		B&M	1871	1906	Nashua and Acton Railroad	
Nashua and Lowell Railroad		B&M	1836	1944	Boston and Maine Railroad	
New Bedford Railroad		NH	1873	1876	Boston, Clinton, Fitchburg and New Bedford Railroad	
New Bedford and Taunton Railroad		NH	1839	1873	New Bedford Railroad	
New England Railroad		NH	1895	1908	New York, New Haven and Hartford Railroad	
New Haven and Northampton Company		NH	1862	1910	New York, New Haven and Hartford Railroad	
New London Northern Railroad		CN	1860	1951	Central Vermont Railway	
New London, Willimantic and Palmer Railroad		CN	1848	1861	New London Northern Railroad	
New York and Boston Railroad		NH	1853	1865	Boston, Hartford and Erie Railroad	
New York Central Railroad	NYC	NYC	1914	1968	Penn Central Transportation Company	
New York Central and Hudson River Railroad		NYC	1900	1914	New York Central Railroad	
New York and Harlem Railroad		NYC	1831	1976	N/A	Was located in present-day New York; the boundary was moved in 1855
New York and New England Railroad		NH	1873	1895	New England Railroad	
New York, New Haven and Hartford Railroad	NH	NH	1872	1969	Penn Central Transportation Company	
Newburyport Railroad		B&M	1846	1906	Boston and Maine Railroad	
Newburyport City Railroad		B&M	1869	1893	Boston and Maine Railroad	
Newport and Fall River Railroad		NH	1846	1863	Old Colony and Newport Railway	
Norfolk County Railroad		NH	1847	1853	Boston and New York Central Railroad	
North Brookfield Railroad		NYC	1875	1976	Consolidated Rail Corporation	Plans to rebuild and reopen 2012
Northampton and Springfield Railroad		B&M	1842	1845	Connecticut River Railroad	
Northampton and Westfield Railroad		NH	1852	1853	Hampshire and Hampden Railroad	
Norwich and Worcester Railroad		NH	1836	1976	Consolidated Rail Corporation	
Ocean Terminal Railroad		B&M	1879	1887	Boston and Lowell Railroad	
Old Colony Railroad		NH	1872	1947	New York, New Haven and Hartford Railroad	
Old Colony Railroad		NH	1844	1854	Old Colony and Fall River Railroad	
Old Colony Railroad		NH	1838	1839	New Bedford and Taunton Railroad	
Old Colony and Fall River Railroad		NH	1854	1863	Old Colony and Newport Railway	
Old Colony and Newport Railway		NH	1863	1872	Old Colony Railroad	
Penn Central Transportation Company	PC		1968	1976	Consolidated Rail Corporation	
Peterborough and Shirley Railroad		B&M	1845	1860	Fitchburg Railroad	
Pittsfield and North Adams Railroad		NYC	1842	1961	New York Central Railroad	
Plymouth and Middleborough Railroad		NH	1890	1911	Old Colony Railroad	
Plymouth and Vineyard Sound Railroad		NH	1868	1871	Cape Cod Railroad	
Providence and Bristol Railroad		NH	1851	1853	Providence, Warren and Bristol Railroad	
Providence, Warren and Bristol Railroad		NH	1853	1862	N/A	Was located in present-day Rhode Island; the boundary was moved in 1862
Providence, Webster and Springfield Railroad		NYC	1882	1958	N/A	
Quincy Bay Terminal Company	QBT		1992	2001	Fore River Transportation Corporation	
Randolph and Bridgewater Railroad		NH	1845	1845	Fall River Railroad (1846)	
Rhode Island and Massachusetts Railroad		NH	1876	1910	New York, New Haven and Hartford Railroad	
Rockport Railroad		B&M	1860	1868	Eastern Railroad	
Salem and Lowell Railroad		B&M	1848	1879	Boston and Lowell Railroad	
Salisbury Branch Railroad		B&M	1844	1846	Eastern Railroad	
Saugus Branch Railroad		B&M	1848	1853	Eastern Railroad	
Seekonk Branch Railroad		NH	1836	1839	Boston and Providence Railroad	Was located in present-day Rhode Island; the boundary was moved in 1862
Shawmut Railroad		NH	1870	1871	Old Colony and Newport Railway	
South Reading Branch Railroad		B&M	1848	1892	Boston and Maine Railroad	
South Shore Railroad		NH	1846	1877	Old Colony Railroad	
Southbridge and Blackstone Railroad		NH	1849	1853	Boston and New York Central Railroad	
Southern Midland Railroad		NH	1863	1863	Boston, Hartford and Erie Railroad	
Spencer Railroad		NYC	1878	1889	Boston and Albany Railroad	
Springfield, Athol and North-eastern Railroad		NYC	1873	1879	Springfield and North-eastern Railroad	
Springfield and New London Railroad		NH	1875	1887	New York and New England Railroad	
Springfield and North-eastern Railroad		NYC	1878	1880	Boston and Albany Railroad	
Stockbridge and Pittsfield Railroad		NH	1847	1905	Berkshire Railroad	
Stoneham Branch Railroad		B&M	1859	1870	Boston and Lowell Railroad	
Stony Brook Railroad		B&M	1845			
Stoughton Branch Railroad		NH	1844	1873	Boston and Providence Railroad	
Taunton Branch Railroad		NH	1835	1874	New Bedford Railroad	
Taunton and Middleborough Railroad		NH	1848	1853	Middleborough and Taunton Railroad	
Troy and Boston Railroad		B&M	1856	1887	Fitchburg Railroad	
Troy and Greenfield Railroad		B&M	1848	1862	Fitchburg Railroad	
Turner's Falls Branch Railroad		B&M	1866	1869	Vermont and Massachusetts Railroad	
Union Railroad		NYC	1848	1854	Grand Junction Railroad and Depot Company	
Union Freight Railroad		NH	1872	1969	N/A	
Fall River Railroad (1846)		NH	1845	1846	Fall River Railroad	
Vermont Central Railroad		CN	1871	1873	Central Vermont Railroad	
Vermont and Massachusetts Railroad		B&M	1844			
Vineyard Sound Railroad		NH	1861	1868	Plymouth and Vineyard Sound Railroad	
Walpole Railroad		NH	1846	1847	Norfolk County Railroad	
Waltham and Watertown Branch Railroad		B&M	1849	1851	Fitchburg Railroad	
Ware River Railroad		NYC	1867	1961	New York Central Railroad	
Watertown Branch Railroad		B&M	1846	1846	Fitchburg Railroad	
Wayland and Sudbury Branch Railroad		B&M	1868	1869	Massachusetts Central Railroad	
Weir Branch Railroad		NH	1847	1848	New Bedford and Taunton Railroad	
West Amesbury Branch Railroad		B&M	1868	1893	Boston and Maine Railroad	
West Stockbridge Railroad		NH	1836	1905	Berkshire Railroad	
Western Railroad		NYC	1833	1867	Boston and Albany Railroad	
Winchendon Railroad		B&M	1845	1846	Cheshire Railroad	
Woburn Branch Railroad		B&M	1844	1844	Boston and Lowell Railroad	
Woburn Branch Extension Railroad		B&M	1847	1848	Boston and Lowell Railroad	
Worcester Branch Railroad		B&M	1841	1847	Worcester and Nashua Railroad	
Worcester and Nashua Railroad		B&M	1845	1883	Worcester, Nashua and Rochester Railroad	
Worcester, Nashua and Rochester Railroad		B&M	1883	1911	Boston and Maine Railroad	
Worcester and Norwich Railroad		NH	1833	1836	Norwich and Worcester Railroad	
Worcester and Shrewsbury Railroad			1873			

Street and other electric railways

- Berkshire Street Railway
- Boston Elevated Railway
- Boston and Worcester Street Railway
- Cambridge Railroad
- Conway Electric Street Railway
- Eastern Massachusetts Street Railway
- Grafton and Upton Railroad
- Metropolitan Railroad
- Middlesex and Boston Street Railway
- Middlesex Railroad
- Milford and Uxbridge Street Railway
- Palmer and Monson Street Railway
- Pittsfield Electric Street Railway
- Shelburne Falls and Colrain Street Railway
- South Boston Railroad
- Springfield and Eastern Street Railway
- Upton Street Railway
- West End Street Railway

Private carriers

- Deerfield River Pulp and Paper Corporation

Not completed

- Hampden Railroad
- Lancaster Railroad
- New York and Boston Rapid Transit Company
- Southern New England Railway

== See also ==
- List of railroad lines in Massachusetts (a list of all corridors that have existed, not dealing with ownership changes)
- List of United States railroads
