= List of railroad lines in Massachusetts =

This is a list of all freight railroad (not streetcar or rapid transit) lines that have been built in Massachusetts, and does not deal with ownership changes from one company to another. The lines are named by the first company to build or consolidate them.

== B&A lines and related railroads ==
These railroads were owned by or closely related to the Boston and Albany Railroad, later part of the New York Central Railroad.

Name	From	To	Branches	Notes
Boston and Worcester Railroad	Boston	Worcester	Brookline Branch, Beacon Street to Brookline; Milford Branch, Framingham to Milford; Millbury Branch, Millbury Junction to Millbury; Newton Highlands Branch, Riverside to Cook Street Junction; Newton Lower Falls Branch, Riverside to Newton Lower Falls; Saxonville Branch, Natick to Saxonville	Framingham Branch became part of the NYNH&H
Chester and Becket Railroad	Chester	Becket		
Grand Junction Railroad	Allston	East Boston		
North Brookfield Railroad	East Brookfield	North Brookfield		
Pittsfield and North Adams Railroad	North Adams Junction	North Adams		
Providence, Webster and Springfield Railroad	Webster Junction	Webster	East Village Branch, Webster Mills to East Village	
Spencer Railroad	South Spencer	Spencer		
Springfield, Athol and North-eastern Railroad	Athol Junction	Athol		
Ware River Railroad	Palmer	Winchendon		Massachusetts Central Railroad today, operating between Palmer and South Barre
Western Railroad	Worcester	New York state line in West Stockbridge		

== B&M lines and related railroads ==
These railroads were owned by or closely related to the Boston and Maine Railroad.

=== Connecticut River Division ===
The Connecticut River Division was the former Connecticut River Railroad.

Name	From	To	Branches	Notes
Connecticut River Railroad	Springfield	Vermont state line in Northfield	Chicopee Falls Branch, Chicopee Junction to Chicopee Falls; East Deerfield Branch, Deerfield Junction to East Deerfield; Easthampton Branch, Mount Tom to Easthampton	

=== Eastern Division ===
The Eastern Division was the former Eastern Railroad.

Name	From	To	Branches	Notes
Asbury Grove Railroad	Wenham	Asbury Grove		
Chelsea Beach Railroad	Oak Island Junction	Saugus River Junction		
Eastern Railroad	East Boston	New Hampshire state line in Salisbury	Amesbury Branch, Salisbury to Amesbury; Charlestown Branch, Revere to Boston; Essex Branch, Wenham to Essex; Gloucester Branch, Beverly Junction to Rockport; Marblehead Branch, Castle Hill to Marblehead; Swampscott Branch, Swampscott to Marblehead	
Essex Branch Railroad	Salem	North Andover	Salem Harbor Branch, Salem to Salem Harbor	
Newburyport City Railroad	Newburyport	Newburyport Wharf		
Saugus Branch Railroad	West Lynn	Everett		
South Reading Branch Railroad	Peabody	Wakefield		

=== Fitchburg Division ===
The Fitchburg Division was the former Fitchburg Railroad.

Name	From	To	Branches	Notes
Ashburnham Railroad	South Ashburnham	Ashburnham		
Boston, Barre and Gardner Railroad	Worcester	Winchendon		
Brookline and Milford Railroad	Squannacook Junction	New Hampshire state line in Pepperell		
Charlestown Branch Railroad	Charlestown	Belmont		
Deerfield River Railroad	Hoosac Tunnel	Vermont state line in Rowe		never owned by the B&M or Fitchburg
Fitchburg Railroad	Boston	Fitchburg		
Harvard Branch Railroad	Somerville	Harvard Square		never owned by the B&M or Fitchburg
Lancaster and Sterling Railroad	Hudson	South Acton		
Marlborough Branch Railroad	Marlborough	Hudson		
Monadnock Railroad	Winchendon	New Hampshire state line in Winchendon		
Peterborough and Shirley Railroad	Ayer Junction	New Hampshire state line in Townsend		
Troy and Greenfield Railroad	Greenfield	Vermont state line in Williamstown		
Vermont and Massachusetts Railroad	Fitchburg	Greenfield	Turners Falls Branch, Turners Falls Junction to Turners Falls	original main line north from Millers Falls became part of the Central Vermont Railroad
Watertown Branch Railroad	Waltham	West Cambridge		
Winchendon Railroad	South Ashburnham	New Hampshire state line in Winchendon		

=== Southern Division ===
The Southern Division was the former Boston and Lowell Railroad.

Name	From	To	Branches	Notes
Andover and Haverhill Railroad	Andover	Bradford		
Andover and Wilmington Railroad	Wilmington	Andover		
Billerica and Bedford Railroad	North Billerica	Bedford		
Boston and Lowell Railroad	Boston	Lowell	Mystic River Branch in Charlestown branch, Somerville Junction to Lake Street	
Central Massachusetts Railroad	North Cambridge Junction	Northampton		
Horn Pond Branch Railroad	Horn Pond	Woburn		
Lexington and West Cambridge Railroad	West Cambridge	Lexington		aka: Lexington and Arlington Railroad
Lowell and Lawrence Railroad	Lowell	Lawrence		
Lowell and Nashua Railroad	Lowell	New Hampshire state line in Tyngsborough		
Middlesex Central Railroad	Lexington	Middlesex Junction		
Salem and Lowell Railroad	Tewksbury Junction	Peabody		
Stoneham Branch Railroad	East Woburn	Stoneham		
Stony Brook Railroad	Chelmsford	Ayer		
Woburn Branch Railroad	Winchester	Woburn		
Woburn Branch Extension Railroad	Woburn	North Woburn Junction		

=== Western Division ===
The Western Division was the original Boston and Maine Railroad.

Name	From	To	Branches	Notes
Boston and Maine Extension Railroad	Boston	Wilmington Junction		
Boston and Portland Railroad	Wilmington	New Hampshire state line in Haverhill	Methuen Branch, Lawrence to New Hampshire state line in Methuen	
Danvers Railroad	Wakefield	Danvers Junction		
Danvers and Georgetown Railroad	Danvers Junction	Georgetown		
Lowell and Andover Railroad	Lowell Junction	Lowell		
Medford branch	Medford Junction	Medford Square		
Nashua, Acton and Boston Railroad	Acton	New Hampshire state line in Dunstable		
Newburyport Railroad	Bradford	Newburyport		
West Amesbury Branch Railroad	Merrimac	New Hampshire state line in Merrimac		

=== Worcester, Nashua and Portland Division ===
The Worcester, Nashua and Portland Division was the former Worcester, Nashua and Rochester Railroad.

Name	From	To	Branches	Notes
Worcester and Nashua Railroad	Worcester	New Hampshire state line in Dunstable		

== Central Vermont lines and related railroads ==
These railroads were owned by or closely related to the Central Vermont Railroad.

Name	From	To	Branches	Notes
Flynt's Granite Branch Railroad	Monson	Flynt and Company Granite Quarries (Flynt Quarry)		not owned by the Central Vermont
New London Northern Railroad	Connecticut state line in Monson	Millers Falls		
Vermont and Massachusetts Railroad	Millers Falls	Vermont state line in Northfield		The rest of the V&M became part of the Boston and Maine Railroad.

== NYNH&H lines and related railroads ==
These railroads were owned by or closely related to the New York, New Haven and Hartford Railroad.

=== Berkshire Division ===
The Berkshire Division was the former Berkshire Railroad.

Name	From	To	Branches	Notes
Berkshire Railroad	West Stockbridge	Connecticut state line in Sheffield		
Stockbridge and Pittsfield Railroad	Van Deusenville	Pittsfield		
West Stockbridge Railroad	West Stockbridge	New York state line in West Stockbridge (at the Boston and Albany Railroad junction)		

=== Central New England Division ===
The Central New England Division was the former Central New England Railway.

Name	From	To	Branches	Notes
Central New England Railway Springfield Branch	Connecticut state line in Agawam	Agawam Junction		

=== Hartford Division ===
The Hartford Division was the former Hartford and New Haven Railroad.

Name	From	To	Branches	Notes
Hartford and Springfield Railroad	Connecticut state line in Longmeadow	Springfield		

=== Midland Division ===
The Midland Division was the former New England Railroad.

Name	From	To	Branches	Notes
Charles River Railroad	Cook Street Junction	Rhode Island state line in Blackstone	Ridge Hill Branch, Charles River to Ridge Hill	east from Cook Street Junction to Brookline became part of the B&A
Hopkinton Railway	Ashland	Milford		
Norfolk County Railroad	Dedham	Blackstone		
Medway Branch Railroad	Norfolk	Medway		
Midland Railroad	Boston	Dedham Junction	Dedham Branch, Dedham Junction to Dedham	
Milford, Franklin and Providence Railroad	Bellingham Junction	Franklin Junction		
Milford and Woonsocket Railroad	Milford	Bellingham Junction		
Providence and Springfield Railroad	Rhode Island state line in Douglas	Douglas Junction		
Rhode Island and Massachusetts Railroad	Rhode Island state line in North Attleborough; Rhode Island state line in Wrentham	Rhode Island state line in North Attleborough; Franklin Junction		
Southbridge and Blackstone Railroad	Blackstone; Connecticut state line in Webster	Connecticut state line in Douglas; Southbridge		
Worcester and Norwich Railroad	Connecticut state line in Webster	Worcester		

=== Northampton Division ===
The Northampton Division was the former New Haven and Northampton Company.

Name	From	To	Branches	Notes
Holyoke and Westfield Railroad	Holyoke	Westfield		
New Haven and Northampton Company	Connecticut state line in Southwick	Shelburne Junction	Turner's Falls Branch, South Deerfield to Turners Falls; Williamsburg Branch, Williamsburg Junction to Williamsburg	

=== Old Colony Division ===
The Old Colony Division was the former Old Colony Railroad.

Name	From	To	Branches	Notes
Agricultural Branch Railroad	Framingham Centre	Pratt's Junction	Lancaster Mills Branch, Lancaster Mills Junction to Lancaster Mills; Marlborough Branch, Marlborough Junction to Marlborough	
Attleborough Branch Railroad	Attleboro	North Attleborough		later operated as a streetcar line
Boston and Providence Railroad	Boston	Rhode Island state line in Attleboro	Dedham Branch, Forest Hills to Readville via Dedham; East Providence Branch, East Junction to Rhode Island state line in Attleboro; Needham Branch, West Roxbury to Needham Junction	
Boston and Worcester Railroad Framingham Branch	Framingham	Framingham Centre		
Bridgewater Branch Railroad	Whitman Junction	Bridgewater Junction		
Cape Cod Railroad	Orleans	Provincetown		
Cape Cod Branch Railroad	Middleborough	Hyannis	Woods Hole Branch, Buzzards Bay to Woods Hole	
Cape Cod Central Railroad	Yarmouth	Orleans		
Chatham Railroad	Harwich	Chatham		
Dighton and Somerset Railroad	South Braintree	Somerset Junction		Part was built by the Easton Branch Railroad
Dorchester and Milton Branch Railroad	Neponset	Mattapan		
Duxbury and Cohasset Railroad	Cohasset	Kingston		
Easton Branch Railroad	Stoughton	Easton		
Fairhaven Branch Railroad	West Wareham Junction	Fairhaven		
Fall River Branch Railroad	Myricks	Fall River		
Fall River Railroad	Braintree Highlands	Myricks		
Fitchburg and Worcester Railroad	Fitchburg	Sterling Junction		
Fore River Railroad	East Braintree	Quincy Point		Owned by Bethlehem Steel
Framingham and Lowell Railroad	Framingham	Lowell		
Granite Branch Railroad	Atlantic	Braintree		
Hanover Branch Railroad	North Abington	Hanover		
Mansfield and Framingham Railroad	Mansfield	Framingham		
Middleborough and Taunton Railroad	Middleborough	Middleborough Junction		
Nantasket Beach Railroad	Nantasket Junction	Pemberton		
New Bedford and Fall River Railroad	short connecting track at Taunton			
New Bedford and Taunton Railroad	Taunton	New Bedford	Fall River Branch, New Bedford to Fall River	
Old Colony Railroad	Boston	Plymouth		
Old Colony Railroad Easton Branch	Matfield	Easton		
Old Colony Railroad Elmwood Branch	Westdale	Elmwood		
Old Colony Railroad Raynham Branch	Whittenton Junction	Raynham		
Old Colony Railroad Wrentham Branch	Adamsdale Junction	Norwood Central		
Old Colony and Fall River Railroad	Fall River	Rhode Island state line in Fall River		
Plymouth and Middleborough Railroad	Plymouth	Middleborough		
Shawmut Branch Railroad	Milton	Harrison Square		
South Shore Railroad	Braintree	Cohasset		
Stoughton Branch Railroad	Canton Junction	Stoughton		
Taunton Branch Railroad	Taunton	Mansfield	Attleboro Branch, Attleboro Junction to Attleboro; Taunton River Branch, Weir Village to Old Brewery Wharf	
Warren and Fall River Railroad	Rhode Island state line in Swansea	Fall River		

=== Providence and Worcester Division ===
The Providence and Worcester Division was the former Providence and Worcester Railroad.

Name	From	To	Branches	Notes
Providence and Worcester Railroad	Connecticut state line in Blackstone	Worcester		

== Other railroads ==
Name	From	To	Branches	Notes
Boston, Revere Beach and Lynn Railroad	East Boston	Lynn	Winthrop Branch, Orient Heights to loop through Winthrop	see also Boston, Winthrop and Point Shirley Railroad and Eastern Junction, Broad Sound Pier and Point Shirley Railroad, which built lines and later abandoned them
Cape Ann Granite Railroad	Pigeon Cove Harbor	Cape Ann Granite Company quarries		
Grafton and Upton Railroad	North Grafton	Milford	Upton Loop, West Upton to Upton	
Hampden Railroad	Springfield	Bondsville		never opened, built by the Boston and Maine Railroad and New York, New Haven and Hartford Railroad
Lancaster Railroad	Lancaster	Hudson		never opened, built by the Boston and Maine Railroad
Martha's Vineyard Railroad	Oak Bluffs	South Beach		
Nantucket Railroad	Nantucket	Siasconset		
Southern New England Railway	Palmer	Rhode Island state line in Blackstone		never finished, built by the Grand Trunk Railway
Union Freight Railroad	connecting lines in downtown Boston			

== See also ==
- List of Massachusetts railroads
