= Newton Junction, New Hampshire =

Unincorporated community in New Hampshire, United States

- Unincorporated community
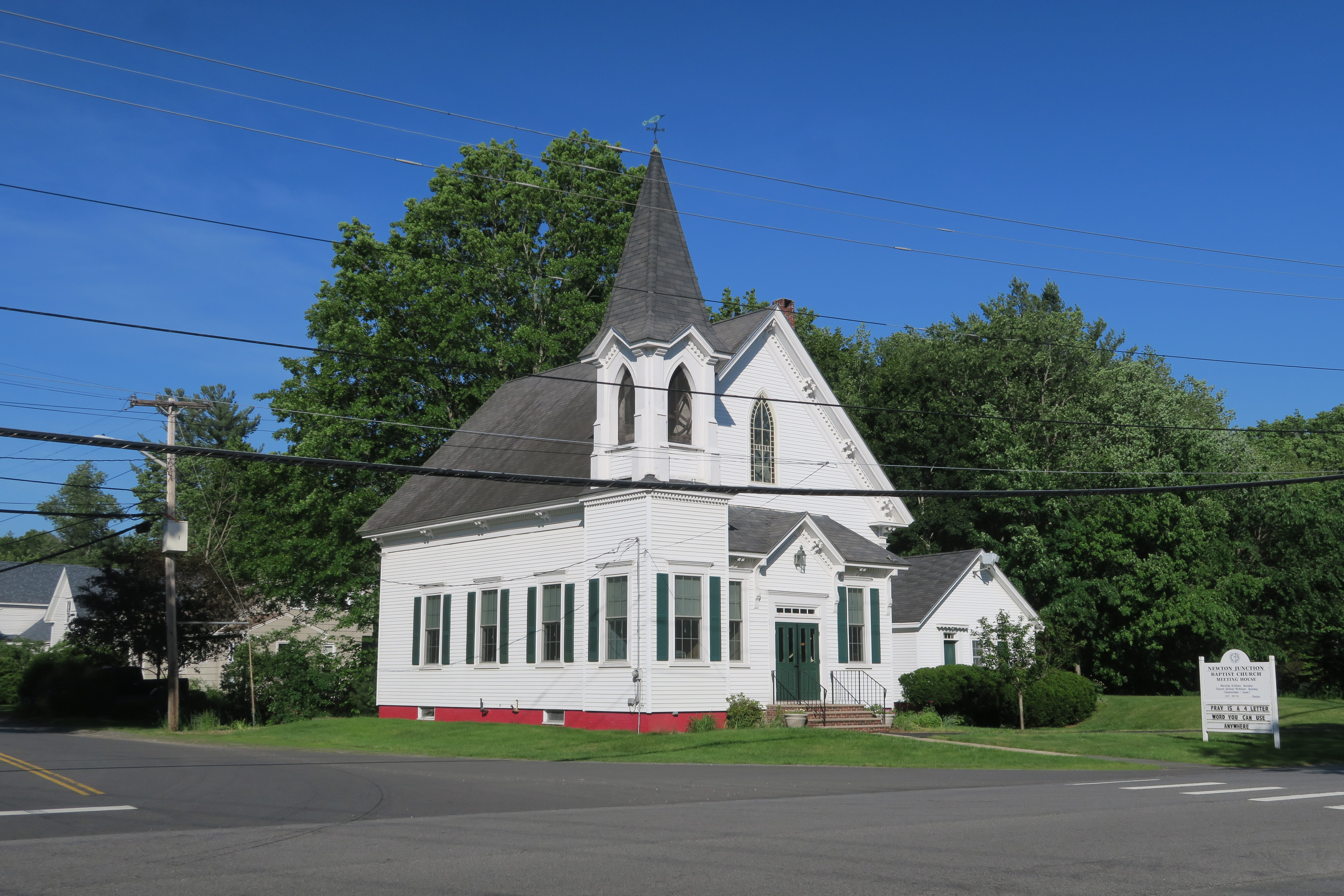
- Newton Junction Baptist Church

- Location within New Hampshire Location within the United States
- Coordinates: 42°52′02″N 71°03′57″W
- Country: United States
- State: New Hampshire
- County: Rockingham
- Town: Newton
- Elevation: 125 ft (38 m)
- Time zone: UTC-5 (Eastern (EST))
  - Summer (DST): UTC-4 (EDT)
- ZIP code: 03859
- Area code: 603
- GNIS feature ID: 868735

Newton Junction is an unincorporated community in the town of Newton in Rockingham County, New Hampshire, United States. It is located in the western portion of Newton, between the main portion of Newton (to the east) and South Kingston (to the west).

Amtrak's Downeaster railroad line passes through the village, but does not have a stop. The nearest Downeaster stations are Haverhill, Massachusetts, to the south, and Exeter, New Hampshire, to the north. The West Amesbury Branch Railroad once led southeast from Newton Junction to Merrimac, Massachusetts.

Although it is not a town, "Newton Junction" is a valid address used for the 03859 ZIP code in Newton (post office boxes only).
