= Lowell Junction =

Railroad junction in Andover, Massachusetts

Coordinates: 42°36′58.1″N 71°9′43.5″W

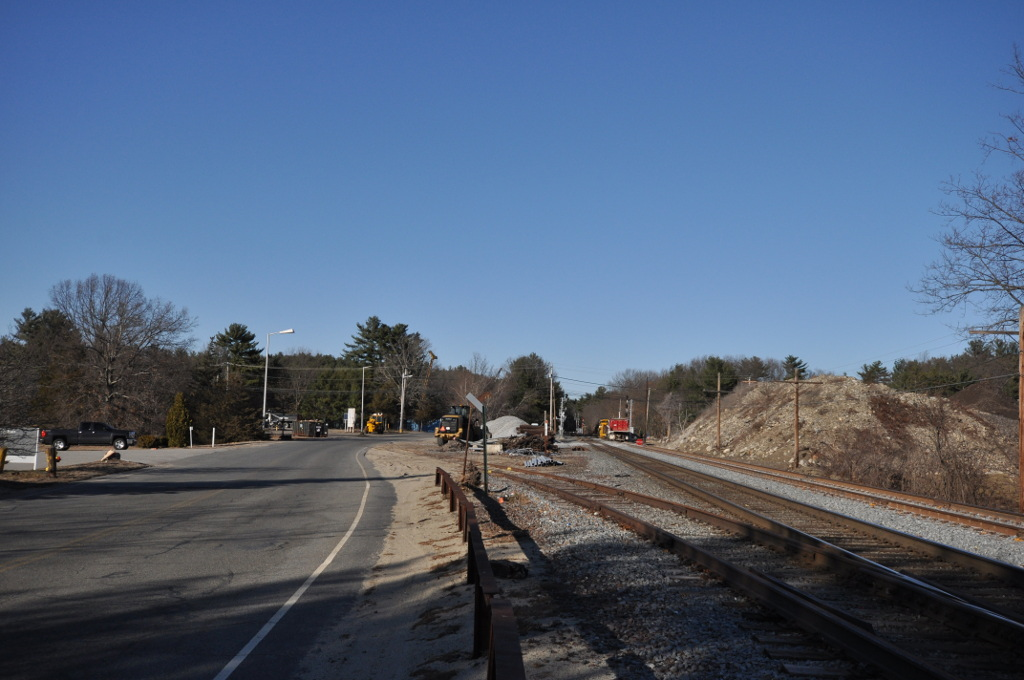
Southern point of the triangular junction

Lowell Junction is a railroad junction located in Andover, Massachusetts, about one mile south of the village of Ballardvale.

The junction was created by the Boston and Maine Railroad in 1874, when they ran a branch line off their main line to connect with the city of Lowell in order to compete with its rival the Boston and Lowell Railroad.

The branch line was built under the name of the Lowell and Andover Railroad and gave the B&M a direct link between Lowell and Boston which it did not have before because of a 30-year monopoly that the Boston & Lowell was granted when it received its charter in 1830. By 1865, the monopoly was gone and the B&M was free to build a line to Lowell.

The rail junction is still in use as of November 2016 by Pan Am Railways as part of its Freight Main Line between Maine and upstate New York, but the connection between the former Lowell Branch and the main line heading south to Boston is not in service, as the freight service between Lowell and Boston is run down the old Boston & Lowell main line.

Before the junction was put in, the area was very rural and part of Ballardvale Village. After the junction went in, Lowell Jct has built up with industrial parks, office buildings and small neighborhoods.

Today, Lowell Junction sees up to 10 Pan Am Railways freights daily. New Hampshire Northcoast Corporation also runs two nightly freights under Pan Am Railways symbol, DOBO/BODO
