= Plymouth and Vineyard Sound Railroad =

Defunct American rail company in Massachusetts

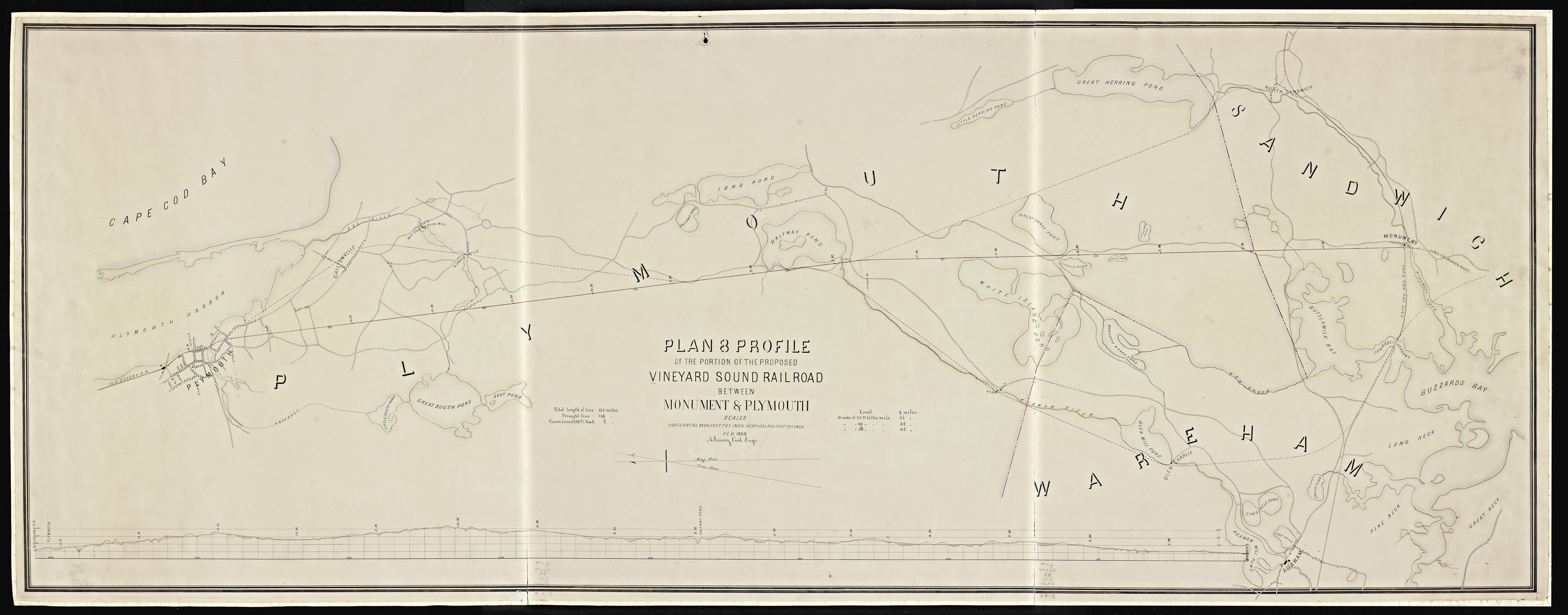
Plan for the line to run to Plymouth from Monument

The Plymouth and Vineyard Sound Railroad was a railroad in Barnstable County, Massachusetts. It was incorporated in 1861 as the Vineyard Sound Railroad Company to provide a rail link between Sandwich and Woods Hole on the western part of Cape Cod, but the name was changed in 1868 before the railroad was completed. As part of the legislative enactment for the name change, the proposal was to extend the line north from Sandwich and connect with the Old Colony and Newport Railway terminus at Plymouth.

In 1871, the Plymouth and Vineyard Sound Railroad was sold to the Cape Cod Railroad Company who finally completed the 17.5-mile line between Buzzards Bay and Woods Hole on July 20, 1872. The portion to Plymouth was never constructed.

Later in 1872, the line became part of the new Old Colony Railroad Company upon the merger of the Old Colony and Newport Railway with the Cape Cod Railroad. After 1884, the line to Woods Hole was used for the Old Colony's "Dude Train" which provided an exclusive link for wealthy Boston businessmen to the ferry to The Islands.

In 1893, it became part of the New York, New Haven and Hartford Railroad as part of the lease of the entire Old Colony Railroad network.

The U.S. Government later constructed a spur off the line to Camp Edwards.

The southern portion of the Plymouth and Vineyard Sound Railroad right-of-way is now the Shining Sea Bikeway.
