= Conway Electric Street Railway =

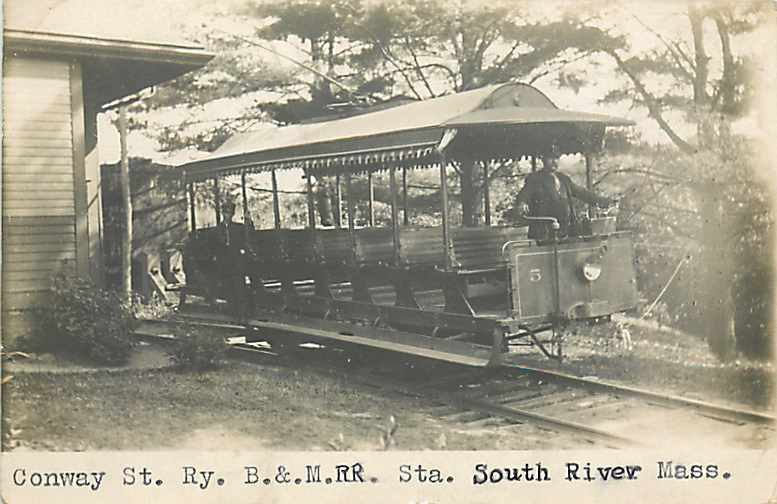
- 1910 postcard of a streetcar at South River station

Overview
- Status: Defunct
- Locale: Conway, Massachusetts
- Termini: Burkeville, Conway; South River station, Deerfield

Service
- Type: Electric street railway

History
- Opened: March 30, 1895
- Closed: 1921

Technical
- Line length: 5.91 miles (9.51 km)
- Track gauge: 1,435 mm (4 ft 8 1/2 in)

The Conway Electric Street Railway was an electric streetcar line that operated in Conway, Massachusetts, from 1895 to 1921.

== History ==
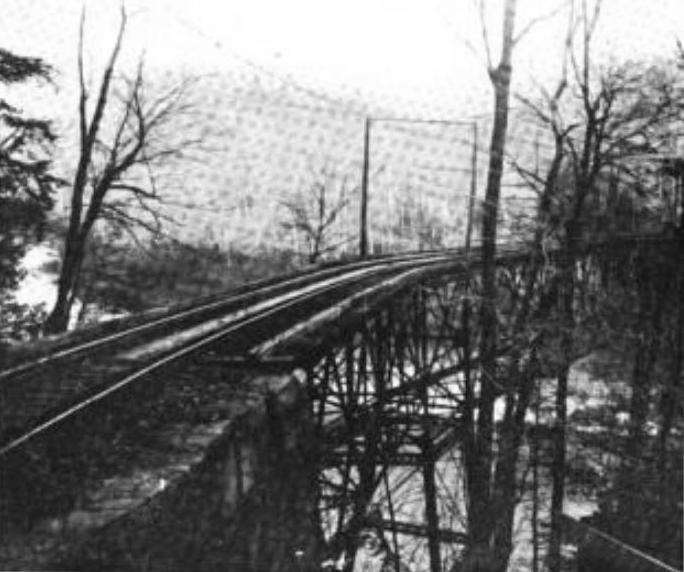
The Deerfield River trestle around 1910

The company was organized on July 21, 1894. A construction contract was awarded to Daniel F. O'Connell & Sons of Holyoke, Massachusetts, in August 1894. The first trial trip was run on March 29, 1895, with revenue service beginning the next day. Freight service began on April 1. It was the first electric streetcar system in the state whose charter allowed it to carry freight.

The line ran northeast from the Burkeville village of Conway, through center Conway, then parallel to the South River. It initially terminated at Conway station on the Shelburne Falls Extension of the New York, New Haven and Hartford Railroad, on the south ride of the Deerfield River. In 1897, the line was extended across the Deerfield River on a trestle bridge to meet the Fitchburg Railroad (soon part of the Boston and Maine Railroad) at South River station. Service was timed to connect with passenger trains at Conway and South River stations.

By 1905, the line owned five motor cars (streetcars and freight motors), ten freight cars, and one snowplow. The Boston and Maine Railroad owned the Conway Electric from 1908 to 1919. The Post–World War I recession and the severe winter of 1919–20 caused financial difficulties for the Conway Electric. It ceased operations in 1921. The rails were removed for scrap in 1922.
