= Milford Secondary =

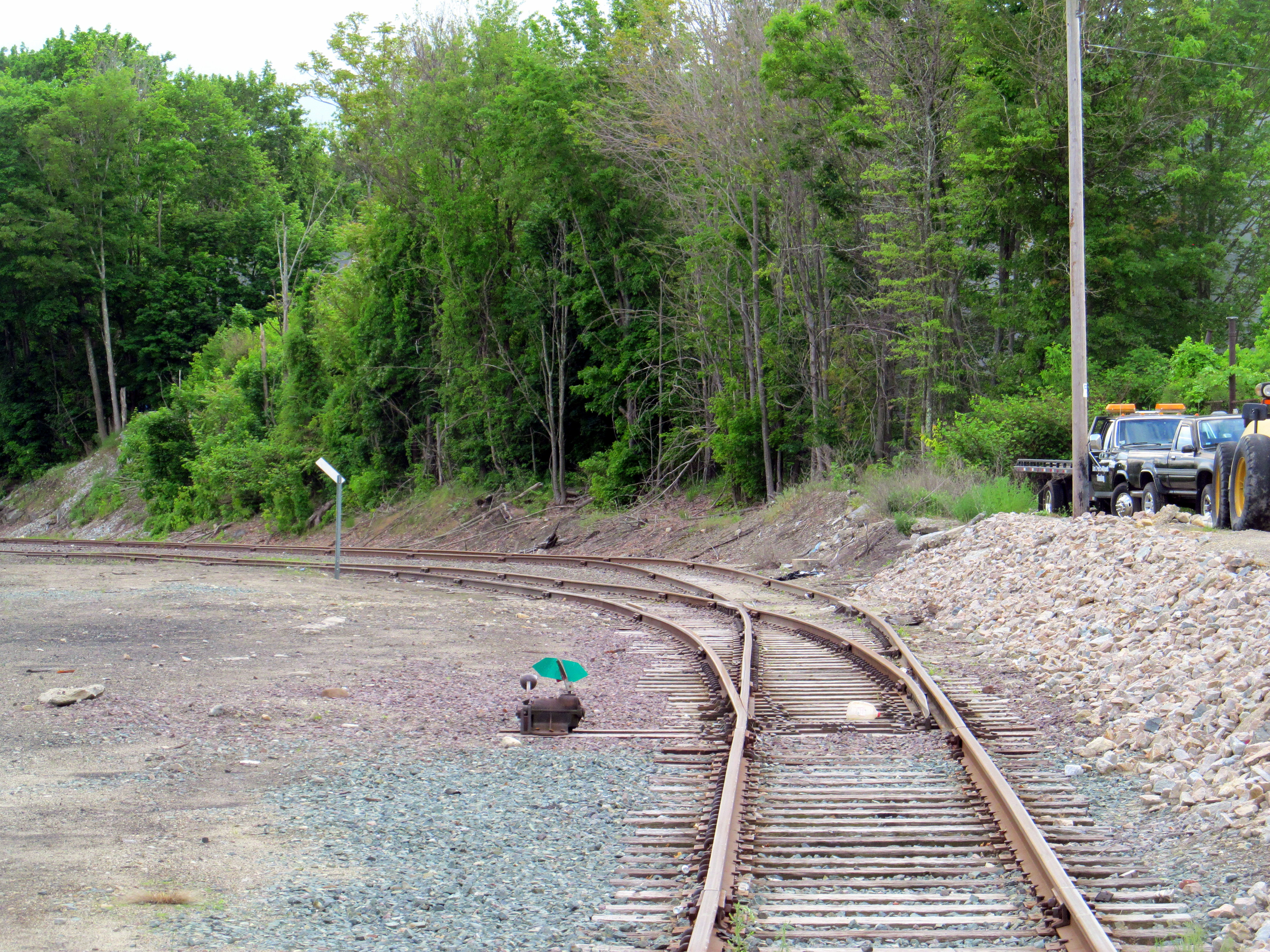
- North end of the Milford Secondary in Milford in 2017

Overview
- Owner: Massachusetts Bay Transportation Authority
- Locale: Worcester County and Norfolk County
- Termini: Franklin Junction; Milford (current) Ashland (former)

Technical
- Line length: Active: 8.4 miles (13.5 km); Abandoned: 11.4 miles (18.3 km)
- Track gauge: 4 ft 8 1/2 in (1,435 mm)

The Milford Secondary is a railroad line that runs between Franklin and Milford, Massachusetts, United States.

== Route ==
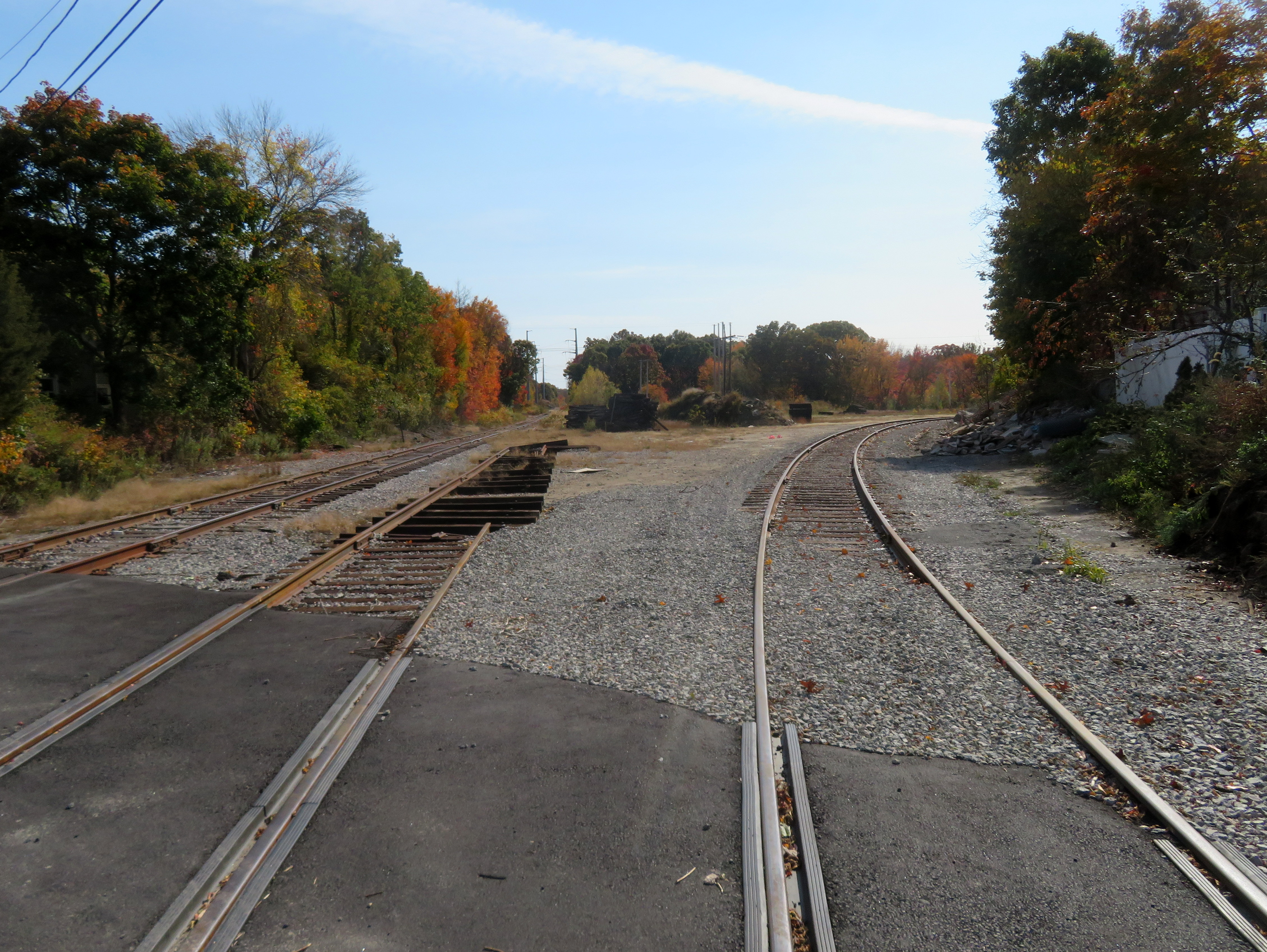
The junction between the Milford Secondary (left) and the Grafton and Upton in Milford

The southern end of the line is at Franklin Junction, just southwest of downtown Franklin, where it splits off from the Franklin Branch. It runs west through Franklin, with Forge Park/495 station located in an industrial park in southwest Franklin. It continues into Bellingham, where it crosses the Charles River in a reverse curve. The middle portion of the curve was formerly shared with the Charles River Branch, which is now abandoned except for a short siding south of the former junction (Bellingham Junction). The Milford Secondary continues northwest to its terminus at Central Street in downtown Milford, meeting the Grafton and Upton Railroad at a junction just south of downtown. As of 2021, only two active freight customers remain on the line, both between Forge Park and Bellingham.

The Milford Branch of the Boston and Albany Railroad (B&A) formerly terminated on the opposite side of Central Street, with freight tracks connecting the two lines. The now-abandoned portion of the Milford Secondary continued north, paralleling the Charles River to its source. It turned east in Hopkinton, then north into Ashland, meeting the B&A near Ashland station. Two portions of the abandoned line have been converted into sections of the Upper Charles Trail, a regional rail trail.

== History ==
=== Early history ===
Map of the Milford and Woonsocket Railroad

The Milford and Woonsocket Railroad was chartered in 1855. It opened in 1868 from Milford to Bellingham Junction on the Charles River Branch Railroad, which ran from Boston to Woonsocket, Rhode Island. It was immediately leased by the Providence and Worcester Railroad (P&W), which connected to the Charles River Branch Railroad at Woonsocket, to forestall competition. Passenger service on the line was focused on Milford–Woonsocket traffic.

The Hopkinton Branch Railroad was chartered in 1869 to construct a branch from Ashland on the B&A mainline to Hopkinton. In 1870, it was combined with another planned line, the Hopkinton and Milford Railroad, to form the Hopkinton Railroad. The railroad opened between Milford and Ashland in December 1872 and was immediately leased by the P&W.

The Milford, Franklin and Providence Railroad was chartered in 1882 to build from Bellingham Junction to Franklin Junction on the New York and New England Railroad (NY&NE) mainline. It opened in August 1883, allowing through service from Milford to Boston via Franklin. The P&W lease of the Milford and Woonsocket expired that year. The Milford and Woonsocket began independent operation of its own line plus the Hopkinton and the Milford, Franklin and Providence; it purchased the former line in 1884. This gave it a 20-mile (32 km) line between Ashland and Franklin Junction.

The Milford and Woonsocket was leased by the NY&NE in September 1887. The NY&NE entered bankruptcy in 1893; its 1895 successor New England Railroad was leased by the New York, New Haven and Hartford Railroad in 1898 as its Midland Division. In August 1898, service on the line consisted of two Ashland–Franklin round trips plus three Milford–Franklin round trips, one of which ran through to Boston.

=== Decline ===
The Milford and Woonsocket was never a strong railroad; the only major population between Franklin and Ashland was Milford, which had a more direct route to Boston via the B&A Milford Branch. From 1911 to 1914, the B&A and the New Haven operated several circuit services, wherein trains would leave Boston on one mainline and return on another. One circuit used the line between Ashland and Franklin Junction plus the B&A and the Midland Division mainlines. Service in September 1912 had two daily trips each way over that circuit, plus two Franklin–Ashland–Boston round trips.

Service between Ashland and Milford was reduced to a single mixed train in 1914. The southern half of the line was similarly reduced to a mixed train in 1919, and all passenger service between Ashland and Franklin Junction ended the next year. In 1926, the New Haven replaced Boston–Woonsocket service over the Charles River Branch with Boston–Bellingham Junction–Franklin trains plus Bellingham Junction–Woonsocket shuttles. This lasted until July 18, 1938, when all Charles River Branch service was discontinued as part of the 88 stations case. It resumed briefly in March 1940, but service south of Caryville (including the segment between Bellingham Junction and Franklin) ended again that May.

The New Haven abandoned the line north of Hopkinton in 1938, after the Interstate Commerce Commission refused their initial proposal to abandon north of Milford. The line was further cut back to Fletcher's Quarry in North Milford in 1953, and to Fells Avenue in Milford six years later. Freight service on the remaining section passed to Penn Central in 1969 and Conrail in 1976. Conrail abandoned a short section from Fells Avenue to Central Street in Milford in 1987.

=== Renewed passenger service ===
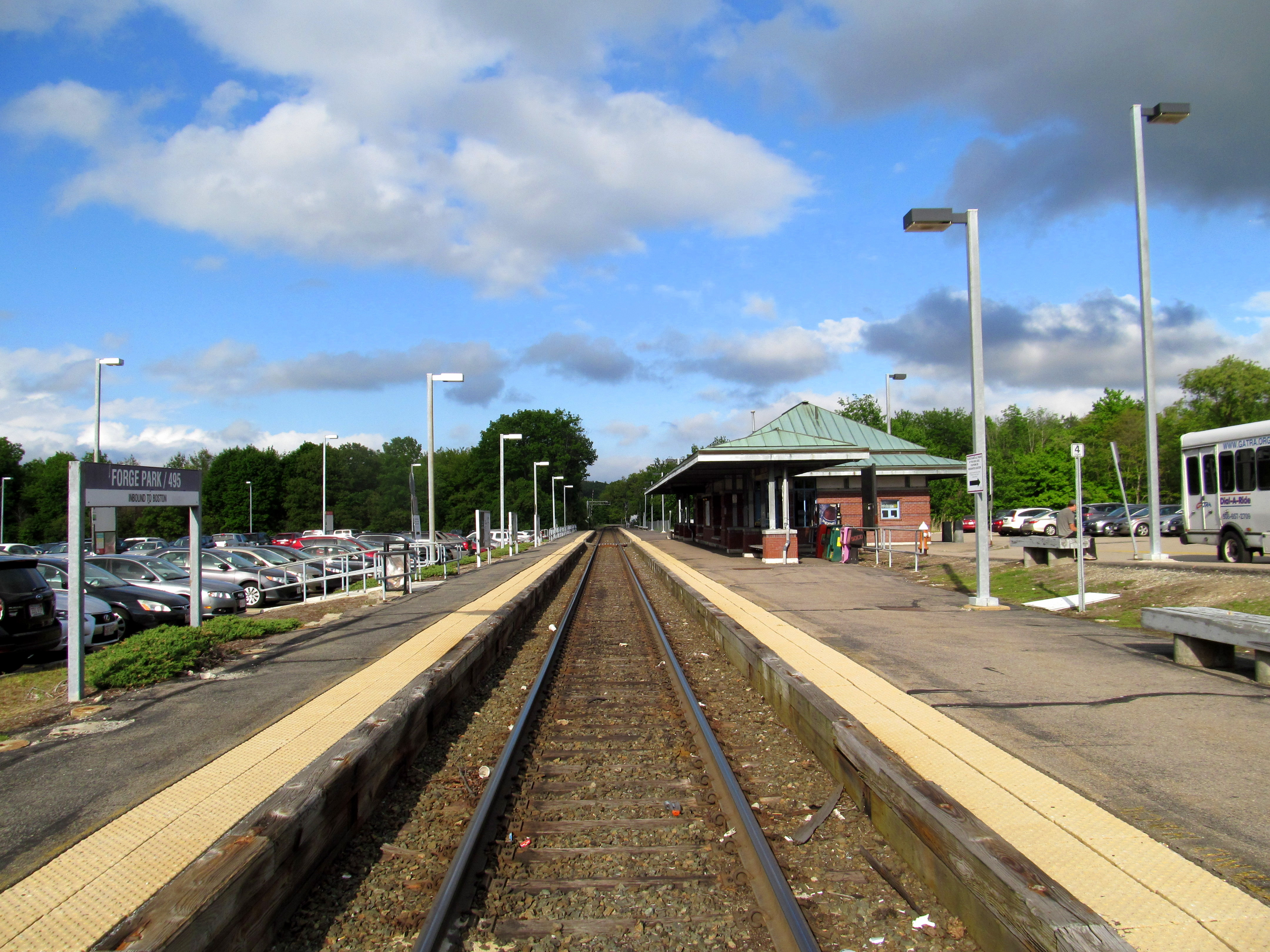
Forge Park/495 station in 2017

In July 2011, a study by the Boston Region Metropolitan Planning Organization proposed implementing new MBTA Commuter Rail service along the line. The new service was to be an extension of the existing Franklin Line, and the plan was to create a new station in Milford, before the commuter rail would diverge onto the Grafton and Upton Railroad, and eventually terminate in Hopedale. A second Milford station was additionally proposed near the intersection of Central and Depot streets, but this location was past where the Grafton and Upton Railroad connects with the line, and it was scrapped from the project. As of May 2018, construction on this extension has not begun, and no indication of when or if it will has been made. On March 1, 2023, the MBTA filed an exemption notice with the Surface Transportation Board to acquire the line from CSX Transportation, with the contract for sale then dated to be completed on April 11, 2023.

== See also ==
- List of CSX Transportation lines
- List of Massachusetts railroads
