= Lowell and Andover Railroad =

Branch line in Massachusetts

Map

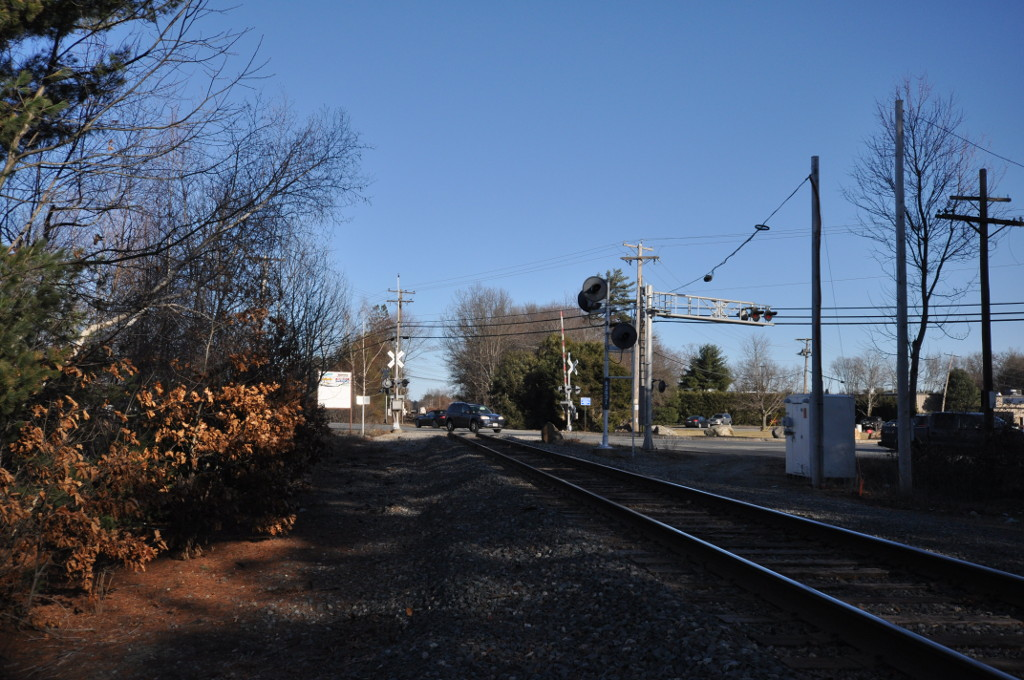
The Lowell and Andover line tracks at East Street in Tewksbury

The Lowell and Andover Railroad was a branch line of the Boston and Maine Railroad (B&M) and was organized in 1873, after the Boston and Lowell Railroad (B&L)'s monopoly on Boston to Lowell service ended in 1865. The line opened in 1874 from the B&M's main line at Lowell Junction in Andover, just south of the village of Ballardvale, west to Lowell through Tewksbury.

== History ==
The B&M organized this railroad in retaliation against the B&L in their long running rivalry which started when the B&M rented trackage rights on the B&L's main line to access Boston from Wilmington. The traffic on the B&L main line was so heavy, the B&M was made to sit and wait hours at Wilmington before being given clearance to continue on to Boston.

This led the B&M to build its own main line from North Wilmington to Boston which angered the B&L's management. Trying to block the B&M from building its line, the B&L filed suit, but lost because its monopoly only covered service between Boston and Lowell.

After the new mail line was opened, the B&M removed its track that connected the main line between North Wilmington and Wilmington so the B&L could not use it. Years later, the B&L would put the track back in and call it the Wildcat Branch.

The two railroads had been at odds with each other earlier when two new lines, the Lowell and Lawrence Railroad along with the Salem and Lowell Railroad began operation around 1849. The Salem & Lowell's tracks crossed over the B&M's main line about a mile north of its North Wilmington station and the crossroads was called Wilmington Jct. In 1851, the L&L permitted the B&M to run passenger service over the S&L from Wilmington Jct to Tewksbury Jct and continue to Lowell on the main L&L track. This was in defiance of the B&L's monopoly on all rail service between Boston and Lowell. In 1855, the courts ordered the B&M to stop running their passenger service and by 1858, the B&L had full control over the two lines. They rebuilt the Wildcat line and now the B&L was in a much stronger competitive position with the B&M now that they had access between Lowell, Lawrence, and Salem while the B&M did not.

The B&M, however, knew that the B&L's monopoly would end soon and would not be renewed. When it ended, the Lowell & Andover was put in motion. The line started on the B&M's main line just south of Ballardvale and went right through East Tewksbury and crossed over the Lowell & Lawrence tracks just north of Tewksbury Jct. From here it paralleled the L&L until it came to Wamesit. There the two lines met on either side of the Wamesit station house. As they entered Lowell, they were running about a half mile apart until they met the Concord River in Wigginsville a small neighborhood in South Lowell. The Lowell & Andover followed the Concord River to Downtown Lowell and built a station on Central Street.

In 1895, the B&M built a bridge across the Concord River and followed the L&L line to the Bleachery section of Lowell. It re-routed it traffic over this line and they continued to Downtown Lowell via the B&L main line, which the B&M had taken over in 1887.

Today, almost the entire branch is still in operation. In the 1920s, the B&M abandoned the Lowell & Lawrence in favor of the Lowell & Andover. The only part of the L&L that kept in service was the first mile between the Concord River and the Bleachery. The B&M abandoned their 1895 extension, in 1936 and built a connection from its line on the west side of the river to the L&L line. The original route along the Concord River from Wigginsville to Downtown was abandoned in 1982.

Today, this line is part of Pan Am Railways' main freight line through Massachusetts.

== Sources ==
- Karr, Ronald D. (1994). Lost Railroads New England. Branch Line Press. ISBN 0-942147-04-9.
- Karr, Ronald D. (1995). The Rail Lines of Southern New England - A Handbook of Railroad History. Branch Line Press. ISBN 0-942147-02-2.
