= Fore River Railroad =

Railroad in Massachusetts, United States

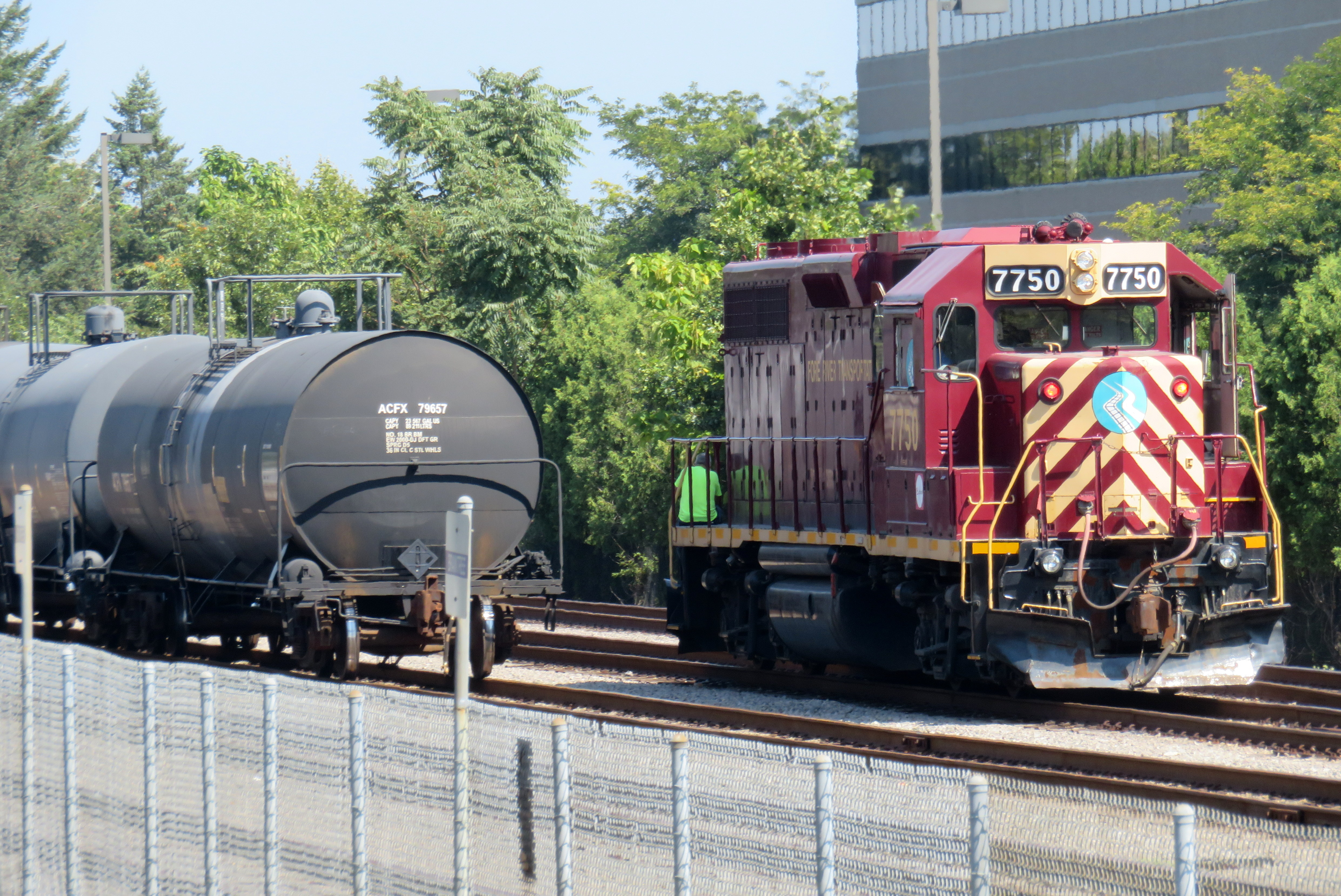
- A Fore River Railroad locomotive in Braintree in August 2018

Overview
- Reporting mark: FRVT
- Dates of operation: 1903–present

Technical
- Track gauge: 4 ft 8 1/2 in (1,435 mm) standard gauge
- Length: 2.7 miles (4.3 km)
Route map
Map of the Fore River Railroad

The Fore River Railroad (reporting mark FRVT) is a class III railroad in eastern Massachusetts owned by the Massachusetts Water Resources Authority (MWRA) and operated by the Fore River Transportation Corporation. It was originally built in 1902 and opened in 1903 as a rail link between the Fore River Shipyard at Quincy Point and the New York, New Haven and Hartford Railroad in East Braintree, a length of 2.7 miles (4.3 km). Originally an integral part of the shipyard, the Fore River Railroad was incorporated as a separate company in 1919 by Bethlehem Steel, which purchased the shipyard itself during World War I.

The railroad continued to serve the shipyard through both World Wars and was bought by General Dynamics in 1963. The new owner ran the shipyard and railroad until 1986, when the shipyard was closed. As local customers still used the railroad, General Dynamics leased train operations to the Colorado Eastern Railroad, before selling the railroad outright to the MWRA the following year. MWRA has used the railroad to transport solid sewage waste (sludge) and fertilizer produced from this sludge. In 1991, the MWRA leased railroad operations to a subsidiary of the New England Southern Railroad; ten years later, the contract was instead awarded to the Fore River Transportation Corporation, a subsidiary of the line's other significant customer, Twin Rivers Technologies. Twin Rivers uses the railroad to ship fatty acids from a facility at Quincy Point.

The Fore River Railroad connects with CSX Transportation in Braintree, via the Greenbush Line of MBTA Commuter Rail.

== History ==
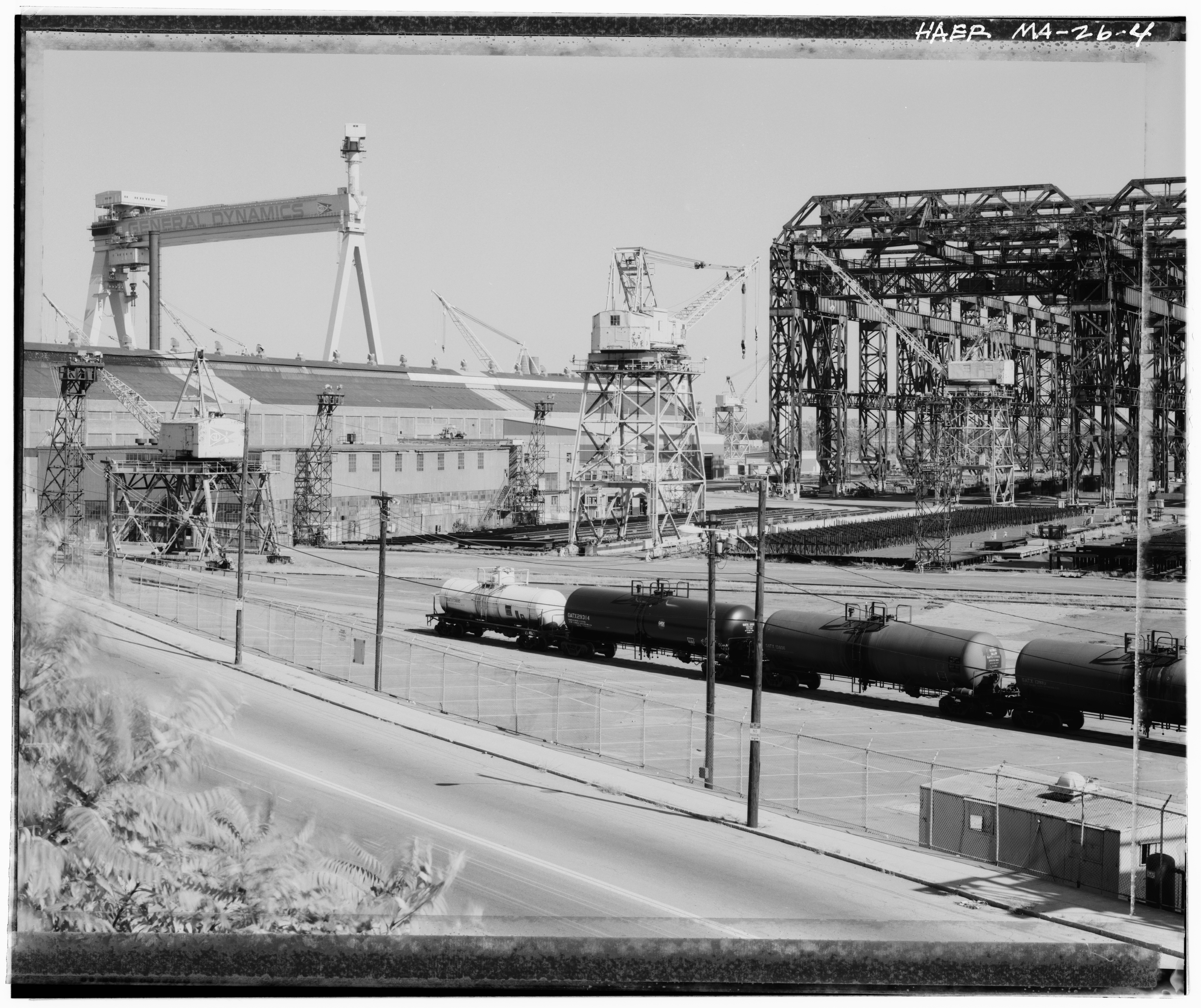
GATX tank cars at Fore River Shipyard in 1984

The Fore River Railroad was originally formed by Thomas A. Watson, telephone pioneer and assistant to Alexander Graham Bell. Wealthy from his telephone inventions, Watson decided to try his hand at shipbuilding, and purchased land at Quincy Point in Massachusetts where he completed a shipyard in 1900. He won a shipbuilding contract from the United States Navy before the shipyard opened. To supply the shipyard, Watson realized a railroad connection was necessary. The New York, New Haven and Hartford Railroad controlled the South Shore Railroad which passed through Braintree, 2 miles (3.2 km) south of Quincy Point, but had no interest in building a branch to Watson's new shipyard.

In response, Watson decided to build his own railroad, identifying a route that connected the shipyard to the South Shore Railroad line. However, Watson did not charter his railroad, and therefore could not use eminent domain to purchase all of the necessary land; as a result, he "was forced to pay dearly for one parcel needed for the right of way". After the offending property was purchased, construction commenced in 1902, and the first train reached the shipyard in June 1903. The company connected with the New Haven Railroad in East Braintree.

Initially, there was no corporate distinction between the shipyard and the railroad; both were part of the same company. During World War I, the shipyard was purchased by Bethlehem Steel, and saw brisk business constructing warships. A connection was made to the Bay State Street Railway at Quincy Avenue, and electrification was added to the north portion of the Fore River Railroad so shipyard workers could take the streetcar directly to the shipyard. This arrangement lasted until shortly after the conclusion of World War I.

Bethlehem Steel formally created the Fore River Railroad in 1919 as a subsidiary. Traffic was modest post-war, until the start of World War II brought increased demand for warships and more business to the shipyard. Bethlehem introduced diesel locomotives in 1946, and the railroad's steam locomotives were all retired the following year. The shipyard continued until the start of the 1960s, at which point business had sharply declined. Rather than close the shipyard, Bethlehem sold it to General Dynamics in 1963. The new owner obtained more contracts from the Navy and the shipyard was once again busy. This continued until 1986, when the shipyard shut down for good. In 1987, the railroad reported an estimated 1,000 carloads of traffic.

While its primary purpose for existing was gone, the Fore River Railroad continued operating to serve a few local industries; these included a soap manufacturer and an oil facility. No longer needing the railroad, General Dynamics leased its operations to the Colorado and Eastern Railroad after closing the shipyard, and the following year sold both the shipyard and the railroad to the Massachusetts Water Resources Authority (MWRA). The MWRA was interested in the land to support its efforts to clean pollution in Boston Harbor. Conrail took over the railroad's lease in 1988.

Under the MWRA, the Fore River Railroad began hauling sewage sludge and fertilizer produced from the sludge. In 1991, the MWRA leased operations to a new company, the Quincy Bay Terminal Company, which was a subsidiary of the New England Southern Railroad. Under Quincy Bay Terminal, the railroad began operating over a short segment of the Greenbush Line to connect with Conrail in Braintree. Quincy Bay Terminal operated the line until 2001, when it was replaced by another incarnation of the Fore River Railroad, this time owned by Twin Rivers Technologies, a fatty acids manufacturer served by the railroad. The Fore River Railroad has continued to interchange with Conrail successor CSX Transportation in Braintree.

== Operations ==
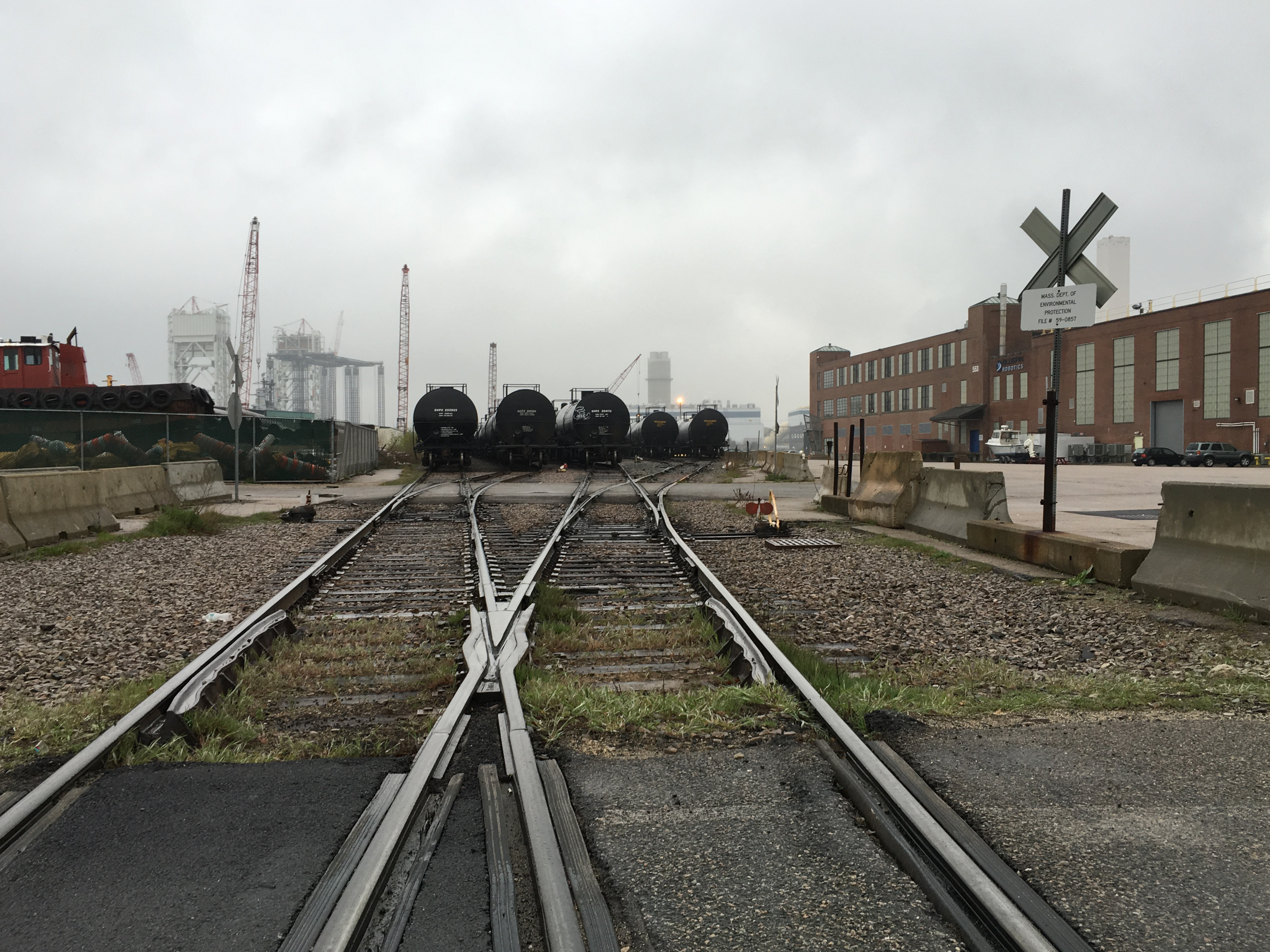
Tanks cars stored in the yard at Quincy Point

The Fore River Railroad operates five days a week and uses three person crews (including an engineer, conductor, and brakeman) to better handle the switching required at both Braintree Yard (involving numerous manually operated switches) and at the end of the line at Quincy Point where cars must be positioned for loading and unloading. Movements over MBTA territory between Braintree Yard and the connection to the Greenbush Line in East Braintree are controlled by the MBTA dispatcher, who grants permission for freight moves during designated windows between commuter trains. Reaching Braintree Yard requires a reverse move for 1.5 miles (2.4 km) to the wye that joins all three MBTA lines in the area. Movements south from the wye to Braintree Yard are over the joint Kingston Line and Fall River/New Bedford Line. CSX freight trains operate at night from Middleboro Yard and along the Fall River/New Bedford Line to reach Braintree Yard and exchange cars.

Train lengths are normally between 10 and 15 freight cars and hauled by one locomotive. The line between Quincy Point and East Braintree has a two percent grade with several sharp curves and rises by approximately 70 feet (21 m) from north to south.

Twin Rivers Technologies accounts for nearly all of the railroad's traffic as of 2025, as the MWRA has primarily used trucks to haul its fertilizer in recent years; potential changes in the market for fertilizer could increase MWRA-related rail traffic in the future. Most of the rail traffic for Twin Rivers Technologies is finished products moving outbound; though some inbound products also travel by rail, the majority arrive by ship. Within their facility, Twin Rivers uses a railcar mover to position cars for loading and unloading, as well as to place them on the designated track for outbound cars and record their weights. As of 2025, approximately 5,000 cars are handled by the railroad annually.

=== Locomotives ===
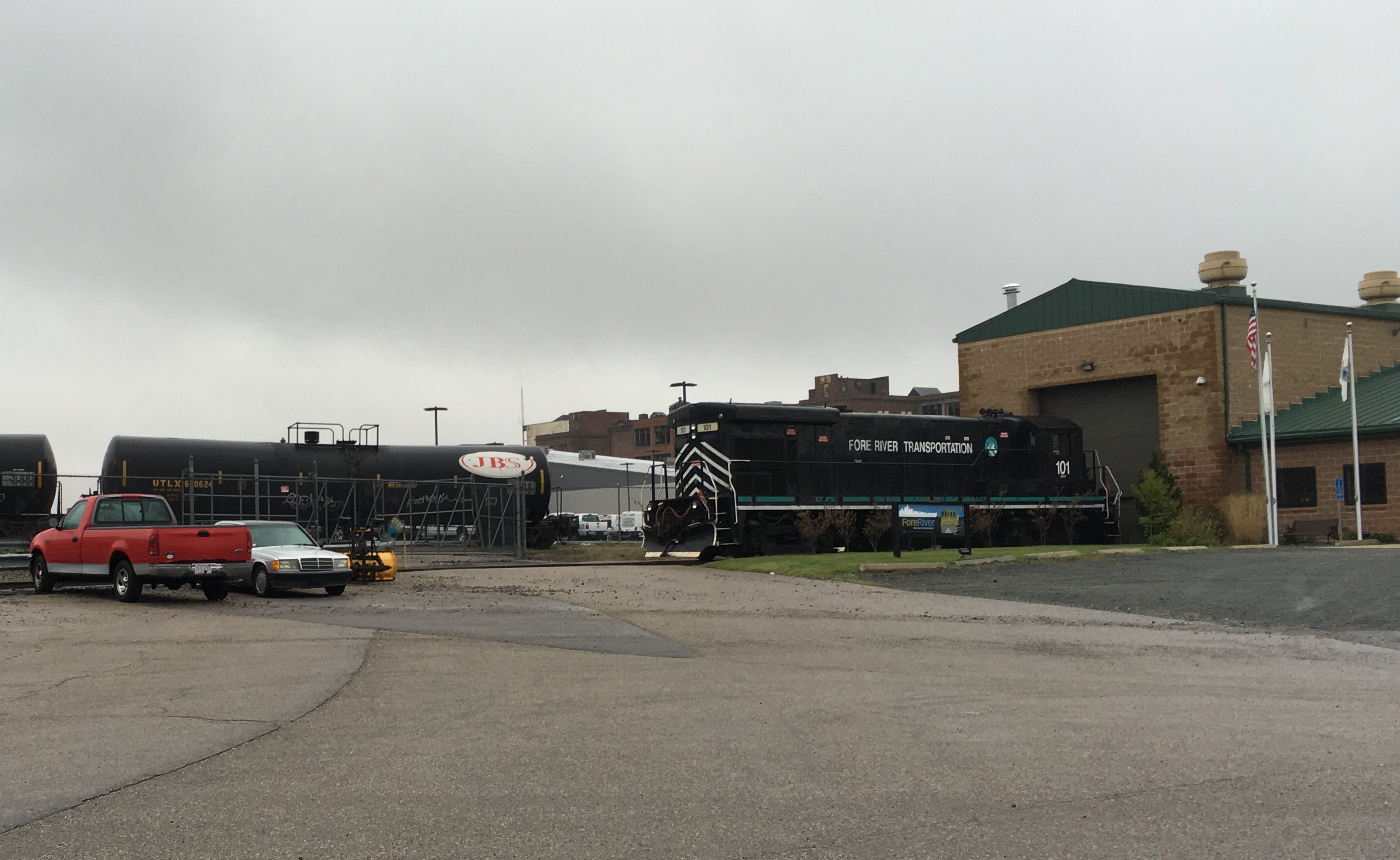
Locomotive 101 at the railroad's engine house

As of 2025, the railroad operates GE B23-7 locomotives 101 and 102 along with EMD GP38 7750. All three were originally built for Penn Central or Conrail. The railroad also holds ALCO S-6 number 17 in storage, which is owned by the MWRA rather than the railroad.

Previous locomotives included a variety of steam and later diesel switchers, with the earliest being a pair of 0-4-4T (indicating 4 drive wheels, 4 trailing wheels, and internal fuel storage rather than a tender) Forney locomotives obtained from the Manhattan Railway Company. These were joined by a 0-4-0 switcher from Baldwin Locomotive Works in 1907. A pair of 0-6-0 switchers were bought from the New Haven in the midst of World War II, supplemented by a 0-4-0 Porter locomotive that was owned by Bethlehem Steel.

The railroad switched to diesel locomotives in 1947 with two GE 50-ton switchers followed by two Whitcomb switchers in 1948 and 1953. Two GE 70-ton switchers from Bethlehem Steel supplemented the Whitcombs in the 1950s as the earlier locomotives were found to be unreliable. The inactive ALCO S-6 that remains on the property as of 2025 was purchased in 1977.
