= Hanover Branch Railroad (Massachusetts) =

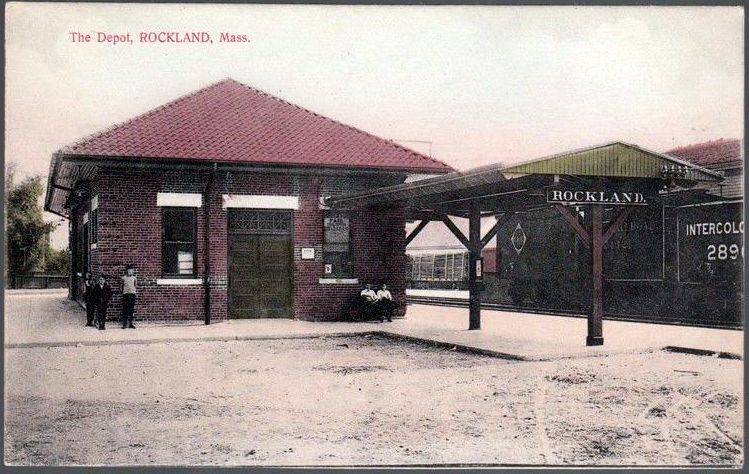
An early postcard of Rockland station

The Hanover Branch Railroad was a railroad in Massachusetts. It was incorporated in 1846 to provide a rail link from the Old Colony Railroad main line in Abington through Rockland to Hanover. The length of the line was 7.8 miles from North Abington to Hanover Four Corners. The line opened for service on July 18, 1868.

The Hanover Branch Railroad was deeded to the Old Colony Railroad on June 30, 1887. It became part of the New York, New Haven and Hartford Railroad in 1893 as part of the lease of the entire Old Colony Railroad network.

Part of the right of way was transferred from the Massachusetts Bay Transportation Authority to the Massachusetts Department of Conservation and Recreation in 2005. State funding for extension of the Hanover Branch Rail Trail eastward into West Hanover was awarded in 2022.

== Stations ==
- North Abington (on the Old Colony main line to Plymouth)
- Rockland
- West Hanover
- Winslows
- South Hanover
- Hanover Four Corners
