= West Amesbury Branch Railroad =

Defunct railroad in New England, USA

Map

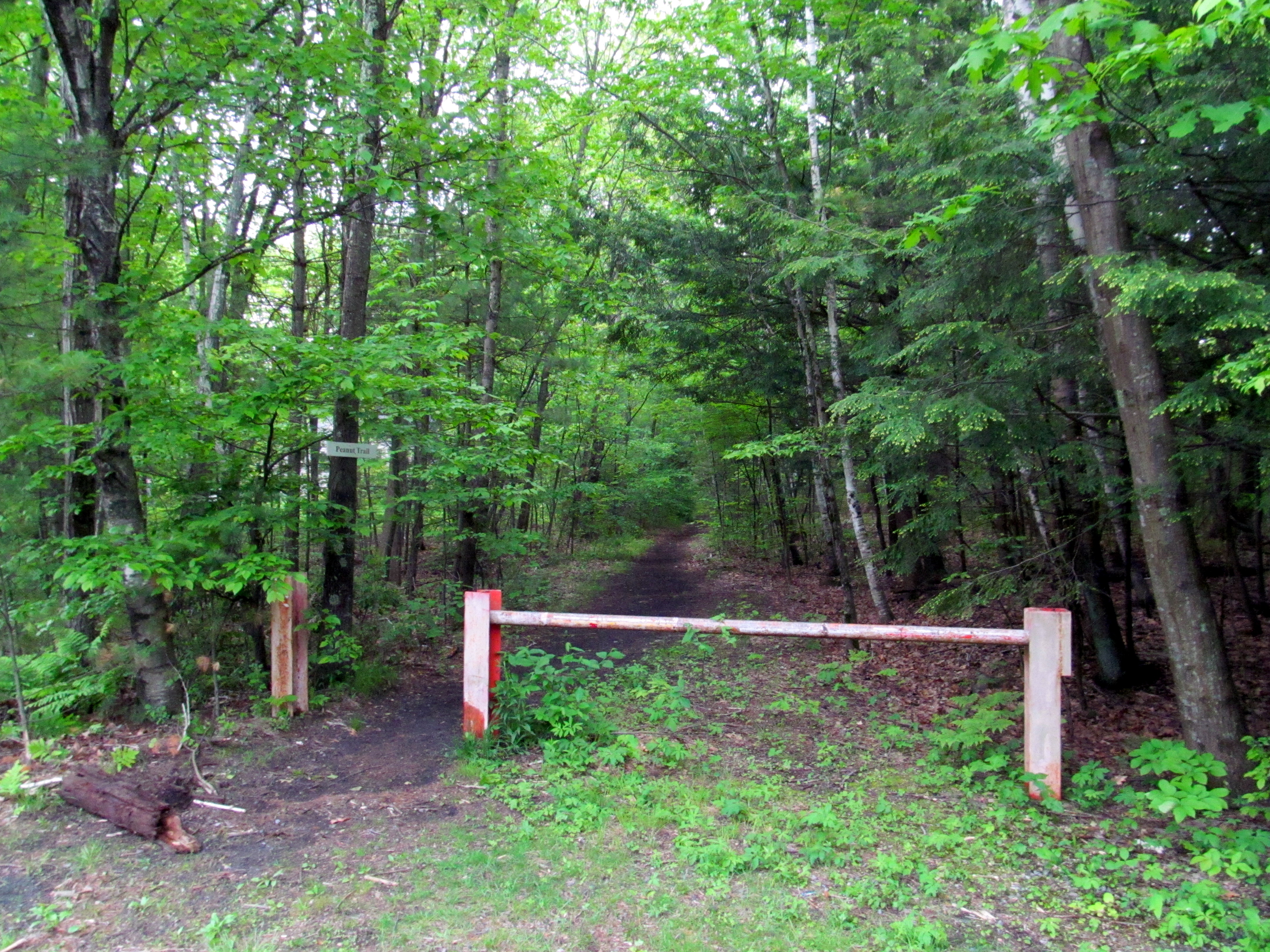
A rail trail on the former line

The West Amesbury Branch Railroad was a railroad line between Newton Junction, New Hampshire, and Merrimac, Massachusetts. It opened in 1873 and was immediately leased by the connecting Boston and Maine Railroad. Passenger service on the branch ended in 1927; freight service continued until the 1972 abandonment of the line.

The New Hampshire half of the former railbed is now a rail trail known as the Peanut Trail. The Massachusetts portion is another rail trail named the Jay McClaren Rail Trail. The two trails are discontinuous due to a closed section in the middle, on private land.

Some track remains of the southern half of the former wye on the Western Route of the former Boston and Maine Railroad, now CSX.
