= Grafton and Upton Railroad =

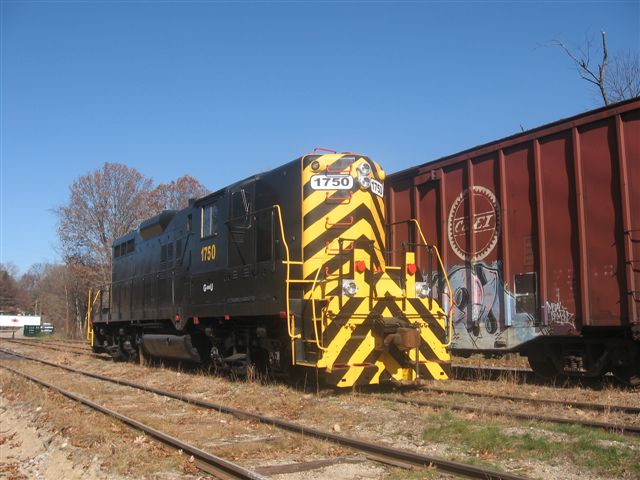
- Grafton and Upton 1750 in North Grafton, MA

Overview
- Status: Operating
- Owner: Jon Delli Priscoli
- Locale: Worcester County, Massachusetts
- Termini: Grafton; Franklin

Service
- Type: Short line railroad

History
- Opened: 1873

Technical
- Line length: 24.85 miles (39.99 km)
- Character: Surface level
- Track gauge: 4 ft 8 1/2 in (1,435 mm)
- Old gauge: originally 3 ft (914 mm) gauge

The Grafton and Upton Railroad (reporting mark GU) is a Class III short line railroad in east-central Massachusetts. This 24.85 mile line runs from Grafton to Franklin and connects to CSX Transportation lines at both ends. Following a period of decline and neglect, maintenance and repairs began in 2008 with the aim of returning the line to operable condition.

== History ==
The Grafton Centre Railroad was chartered October 22, 1873 and opened August 20, 1874 as a 3 ft (914 mm) narrow gauge connection from Grafton to a junction with the Boston and Albany Railroad at North Grafton. The last narrow gauge train ran on July 9, 1887. The line was converted to 4 ft 8 1/2 in (1,435 mm) standard gauge on September 1, 1887.

On February 17, 1888, the name was changed to the Grafton and Upton Railroad by an act of the state legislature. An extension to West Upton opened on March 12, 1889, and an extension to Milford opened on May 17, 1890, connecting to the Milford and Woonsocket Railroad, later a line of the New Haven Railroad.

The Upton Street Railway was absorbed in 1902 and named the 'Electric Loop' or 'Upton Loop'. Passenger service on this loop and the main line was provided by cars leased from the Milford and Uxbridge Street Railway.

In November 1894 William F. Draper of the Draper Company was appointed to the Board of Directors. The Draper Company eventually purchased the G&U and operated it as a subsidiary.

Electric operations typically took place during the daytime, while steam locomotives used the tracks during the nighttime hours. Electric operations ceased on July 3, 1946, and the railroad dieselized during the 1950s. It was at this time that the whole line was upgraded to a heavier grade of track, the first overhaul since the narrow gauge was replaced in 1887.

The G&U ceased passenger service on August 31, 1928. U.S. Mail service along with Railway Express service ceased in 1952.

The Draper Company sold the G&U in 1967 to Rockwell International. Rockwell sold the G&U to a trucking company, Torco, Inc. of Worcester on January 29, 1979. Traffic has fluctuated over the years of Torco ownership.

The last train to Hopedale was in 1988 and for the next 5 years activity was localized solely to the Grafton yard. In 1993 the G&U bought their current engine, the St. Louis Union Station 212 and began hauling salt to Upton once again. This activity lasted until the late 90s.

Torco, Inc. eventually sold the G&U to the Lucy Family. In 2008 the G&U passed hands once again to Jon Delli Priscoli. Delli Priscoli has made clear his intentions to revitalize the railroad in its entirety from Grafton to Milford, and work began in earnest in early 2008.

On February 1, 2021, the G&U increased its trackage by nearly 50% from 16.5 miles to 24.85 miles with the acquisition of trackage rights from CSX to the 8.35 mile Milford Secondary line. This is the first expansion of the G&U since it last expanded to Milford nearly 131 years ago in 1890.

== 2000s renovation ==
In 2004 a test run was made on the track from North Grafton to West Upton. This track was determined to be in usable condition but beyond this point it was so deteriorated that would have been dangerous to operate a train.

In March 2008, 50% of the largely dormant G&U was sold, with the option to purchase the rest. Some in the town of Upton opposed any re-opening or increased use of the railroad line but were unable to have any influence. "We can't stop the railroad," said Selectmen Chairwoman Marsha Paul, "It is going to open. It will be about two years. It's something we'll have to monitor and watch." The new owner, Delli Priscoli, claims that "Railroads are coming back."

In October 2008 the North Grafton depot was expanded to accommodate two cars instead of one.

On December 31, 2009, a test run was conducted, and it was announced that the portion of the line from North Grafton to West Upton was operable. This is the largest rehabilitation the line has seen since the 1950s.

An article in the Milford Daily News dated September 11, 2012, stated: "State and local officials drove a ceremonial spike into a South Main Street railroad crossing Monday, signifying the start of reconstruction of the Milford and Hopedale portion of the Grafton and Upton Railroad... Work on the Milford and Hopedale stretch is part of the second phase of getting the railroad back in shape... The first phase of the work was the stretch of track from Grafton to West Upton... [Railroad spokesman Doug Pizzi] said that he expects crossing construction in Milford will begin within the next month and hopes the entire track will be completed by the end of the year."

As of February 2021, the following is complete:

- The Milford yard has been completely cleared of trees.
- The Hopedale yard has been completely cleared. The old engine house, scale, freight depot, and most of the yard's track have been removed.
- The line from North Grafton to Mendon Street in Hopedale has been completely rebuilt. Improvements include new tracks, new ties, relayed stone ballast and extensive ditch work.
- The West Upton yard had its switches and track refurbished with fresh ties and new stone ballast. Two new spurs were also built.
- The remaining old crossing signals at Upton Street in Grafton, Mendon Street and Greene Street in Hopedale, and South Main Street in Milford have been removed.
- The propane facility in North Grafton has been completed.
- New grade crossings along the entire line have been installed, including through Hopedale and Milford.
- New crossing signals have been installed at North Street, Jordan Boulevard, and Upton Street in Grafton. Signals in Upton at Williams Street, Hartford Avenue, Maple Avenue, and Pleasant Street have also been installed.
- G&U took control of the 8.35 mile CSX Milford Secondary line from Franklin to Milford on February 1, 2021.

== MBTA proposals ==
In July 2011, the Boston Region Metropolitan Planning Organization started studies into extending Franklin Line service from Forge Park/495 into Milford and Hopedale. This study would be the first study into this since a former study in 1997, which concluded that the extension was not high-priority. The study looked into a station in Hopedale, near the privately owned Draper Mill, and infill stations in Milford and Bellingham. A second Milford station was proposed in a 2003 plan for the town near the intersections of Depot and Central Street, but it lies on a spur off of the tracks. Although the study was completed, the extension was put on hold for the near future.

== Locomotive roster ==
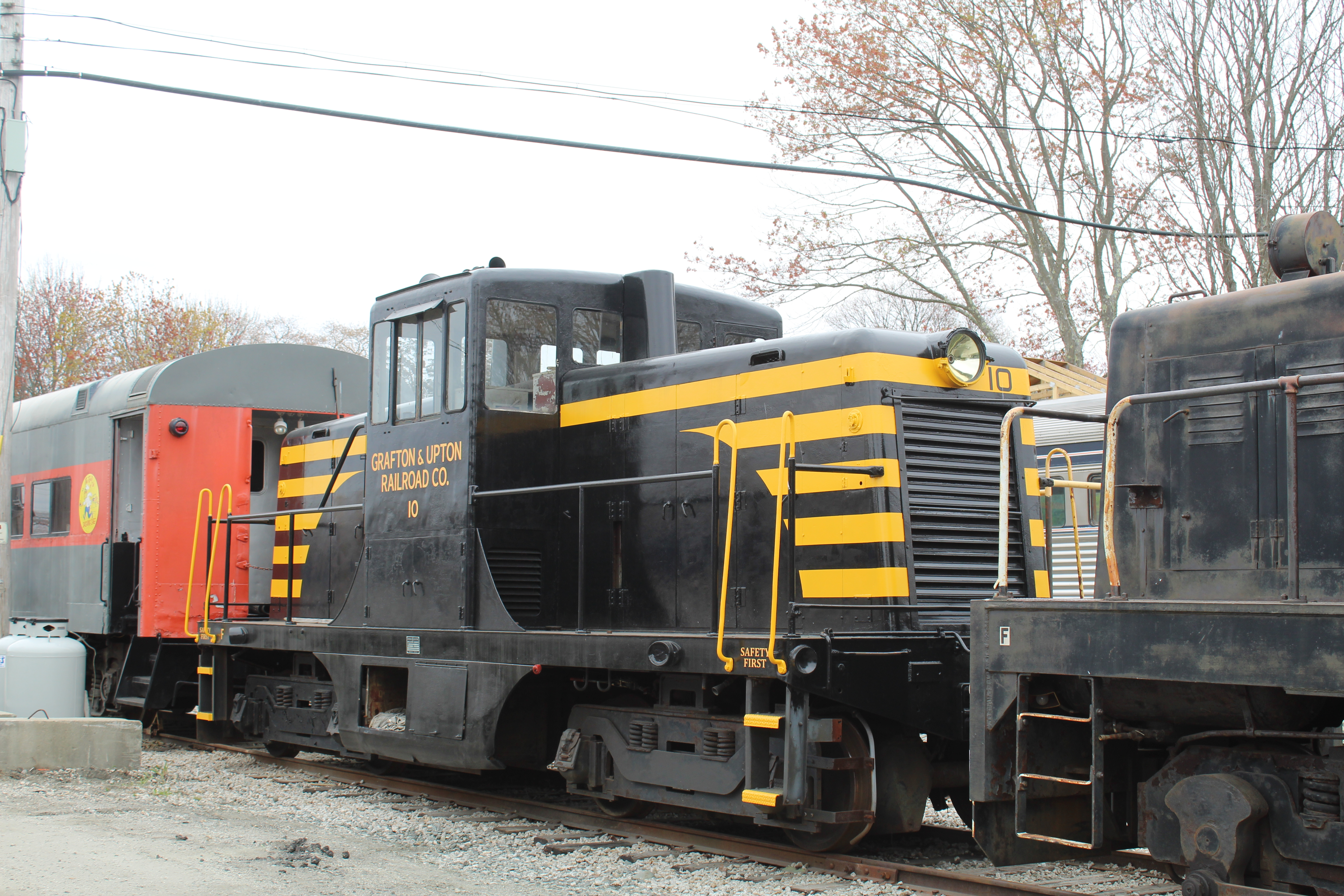
Grafton and Upton 10, a GE 44-ton switcher, at the Newport and Narragansett Bay Railroad in 2023

Until 2017, the Grafton and Upton operated a fleet of various EMD locomotives, including GP7s, GP9s, CF7s, and an F7. These were replaced by one leased and three purchased MP15AC locomotives in 2017 and 2018.
