= North Brookfield Railroad =

Map

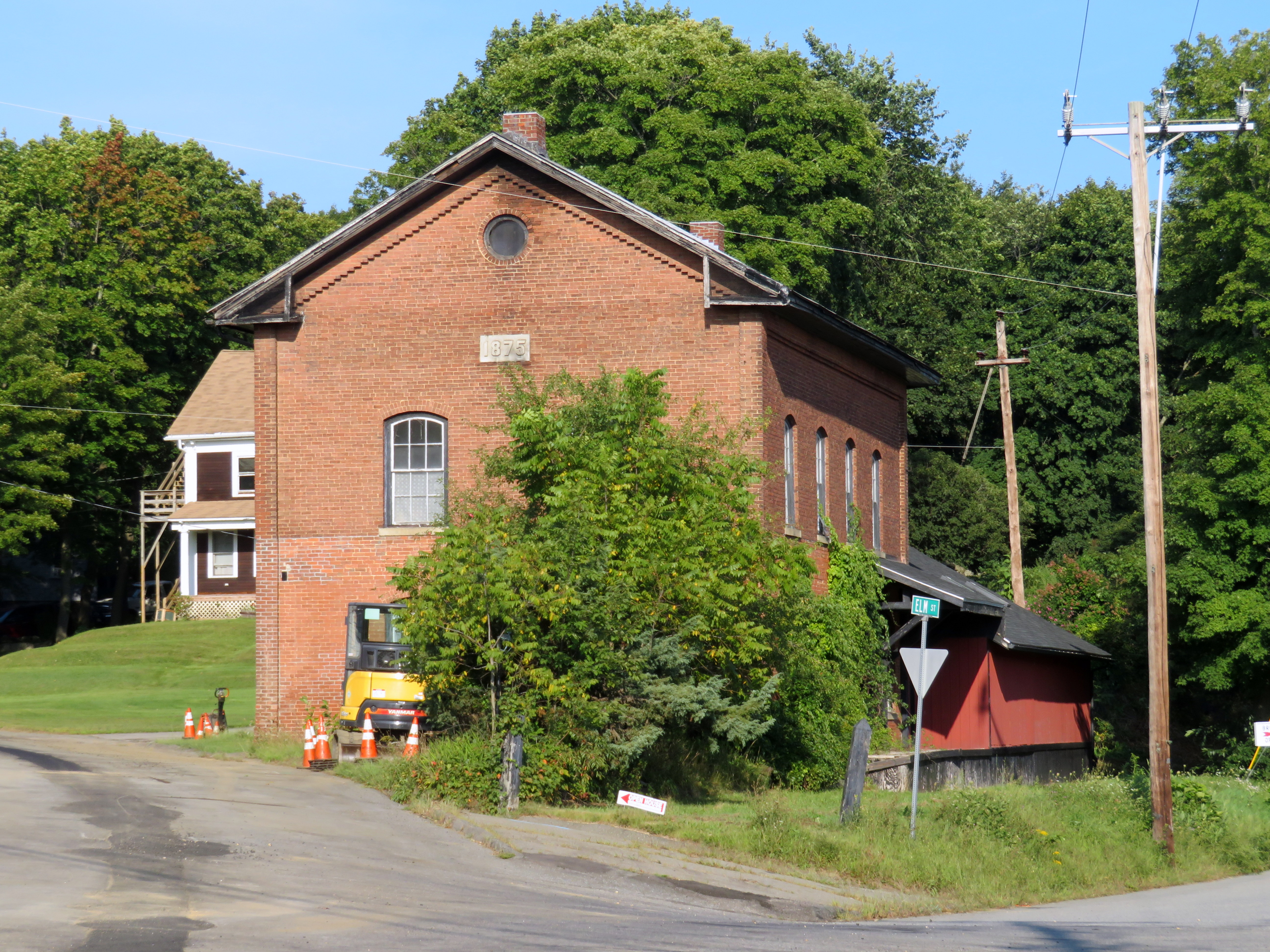
The former North Brookfield combination depot in 2018

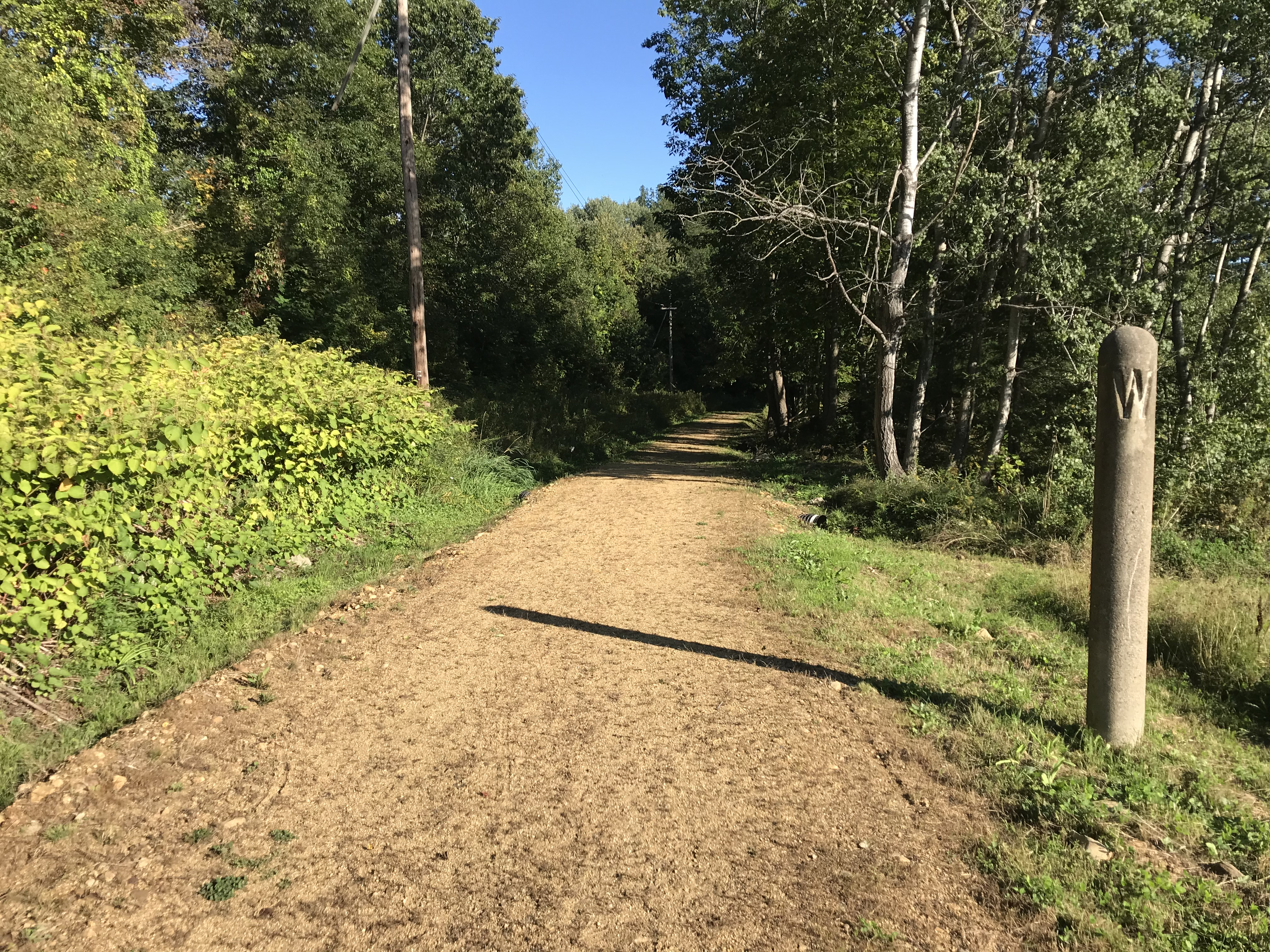
Portion of rail trail in 2021

The North Brookfield Railroad in central Massachusetts in the United States was a 4.16 mile railroad opened in 1876. It connected North Brookfield to the Boston and Albany main line at East Brookfield. The B&A leased the line from opening until they were in turn leased by the New York Central Railroad in 1900. The NYC merged to form the Penn Central Railroad in 1968. The line was abandoned by Conrail in the 1970s. In the early 2010s, an attempt was made to rebuild the line to service companies in the area.

The railroad when formed was 90% owned by the town of North Brookfield. Today the right-of-way is 100% owned by the town of North Brookfield.

Passenger service was discontinued on December 31, 1935. The only stations were at North Brookfield and East Brookfield.

== History ==
The railroad was constructed starting July 20, 1875, and ready for January 1, 1876.

In the first ten years, 107,296 tons of freight was received, 40,040 tons of freight was shipped. There were 451,099 passengers carried with no injuries or deaths. The Boston & Albany Railroad paid a percentage of gross receipts, for a total payment of $24,443.74.

Before the railroad, the stagecoach fare was $0.30. By rail passengers saved 63%. Freight by ox or horse team cost $0.07/100lb. By train the cost was about $1/ton, saving 29%.

The lease was renewed for $3,000 per year. From this income, they paid a tax of $652.89 in 1915. On December 31, 1935 an annual renewable lease was signed, effective the next day. This lease was for freight only, with passenger service discontinued.

=== Proposed revival ===
Daniel Bigda proposed in 2010 to rebuild the railroad for freight service. Bigda planned to utilize two former passenger locomotives and to install a fuel storage tank. Although track would be brand new, the trains would operate at Class I speeds - 10 miles per hour (16 km/h) or less - due to multiple unsignalized grade crossings.

The initiative proceeded as far as the appointment of a constable to serve papers on encroaching neighbors. In May 2018, the town announced that the railroad plans were being abandoned, and that the right-of-way would be converted to a rail trail instead.
