= Martha's Vineyard Railroad =

Narrow-gauge railway in Massachusetts

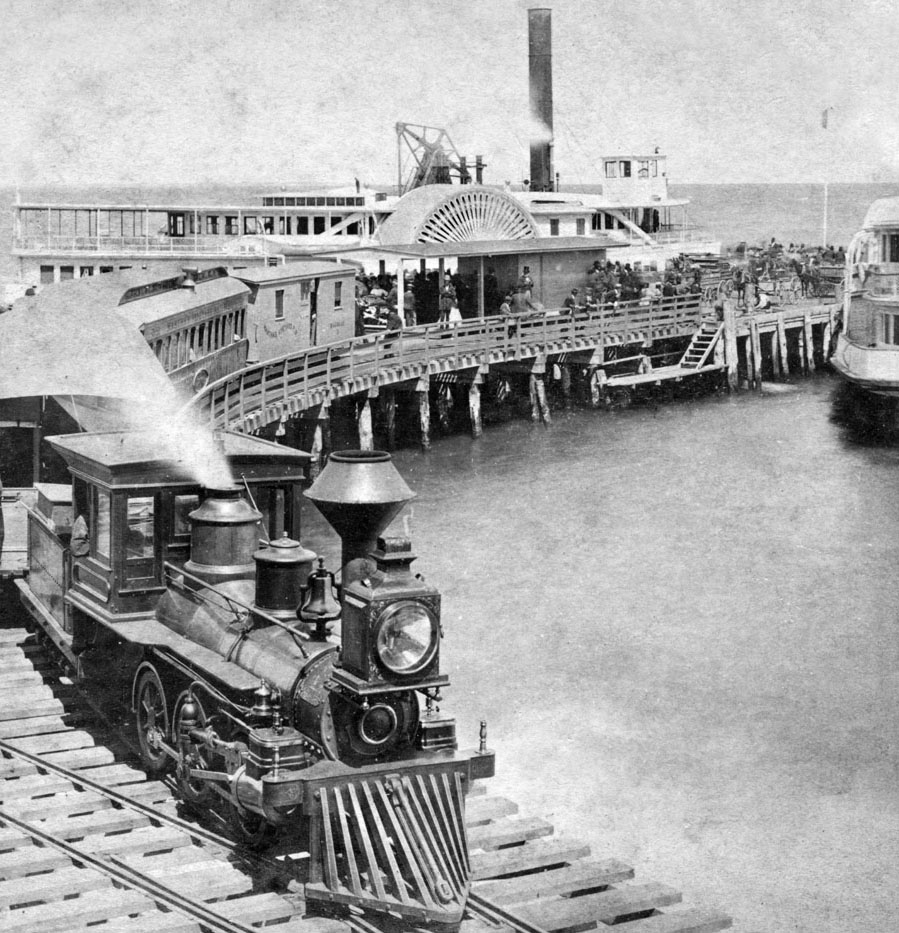
- Engine active at Oak Bluffs

Overview
- Headquarters: Edgartown
- Locale: Massachusetts
- Dates of operation: 1874–1896
- Successor: Abandoned

Technical
- Track gauge: 3 ft (914 mm)
- Length: 9 mi (14 km)

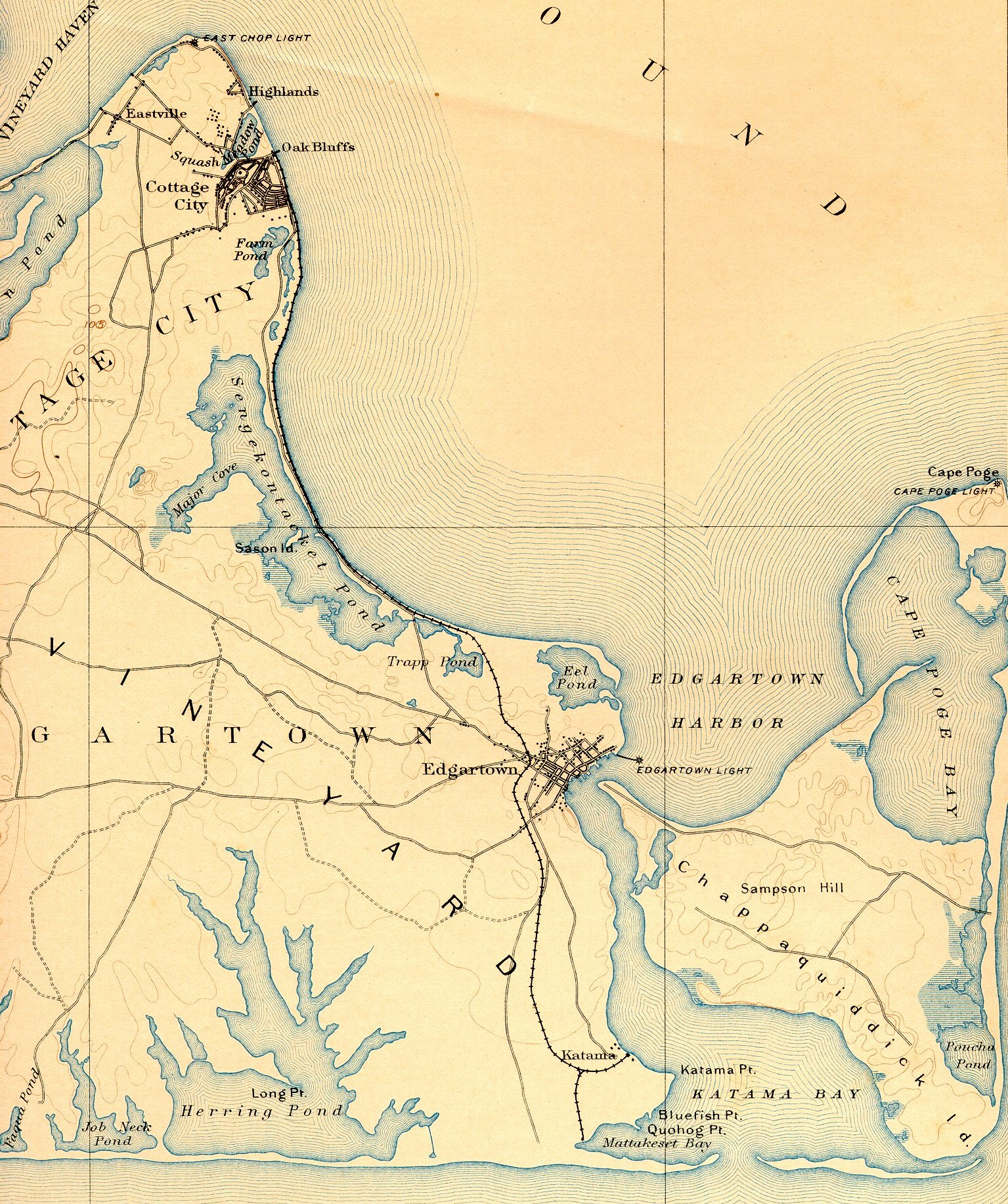
Geographic map of Martha's Vineyard Rail Road

The Martha's Vineyard Railroad was a 3 ft (914 mm) narrow gauge railroad on the island of Martha's Vineyard. It was built in 1874 to connect the Oak Bluffs wharf with the section of Edgartown known as Katama. The line closed in 1896.

== Development ==
After the decline of the whale oil industry in the 1860s, the east coast island of Martha's Vineyard sought to develop a tourist trade. As part of this effort a 3 ft (914 mm) gauge railroad was chartered in 1874 to take tourists across the island. The railway started at Oak Bluffs where steamships of the Old Colony Railroad docked and ran southeast along the shore through Edgartown to Katama.

The line was constructed within 8 weeks across the flat, sandy soil and completed by August 7, 1874. Edward R. Dunham of Edgartown built one half of the bridge over the Sengekontacket Pond, while a mainland contractor built the other half. When the two ends met in the middle, a measurement error of more than 2 inches (50 mm) became apparent, for which the contractors blamed each other, before the necessary corrective action was taken.

Fearing that a conventional steam locomotive might frighten horses, the railroad company purchased a dummy, a steam-powered railcar as it was used by the elevated railways in major cities. On August 5, 1874, while thousands were lining the tracks, the dummy began its maiden voyage. But it only made it to the first tight bend, as the chassis could not rotate far enough due to the sprocket and roller chain drive. Therefore, a conventional H.K. Porter steam locomotive named Active was purchased. On August 17, 1874, it was waiting on a flat car for the journey over the Sound, when some loaded freight cars broke loose and collided with the buffers of the flat car. The flat car stopped on land, but the ten-ton locomotive tipped over into the harbor basin. It was lifted by crane from the muddy bottom of the harbor basin and shipped to Boston to be cleaned and repaired. When it was finally unloaded from the steamboat Island Home at Mattakeset Lodge in Katama via a special loading ramp on August 22, 1874, the summer season was almost over. Decorated with flags, it mastered the route to Edgartown at a brisk pace, which was celebrated as a sensation along the entire route.

In 1876 a short half mile extension from Katama to South Beach was opened, bringing the total length of the line to 9 miles (14 km).

It is possible to drive most all of the original right-of-way between Oak Bluffs, Edgartown, and Katama (with a few short detours).

== Operations ==
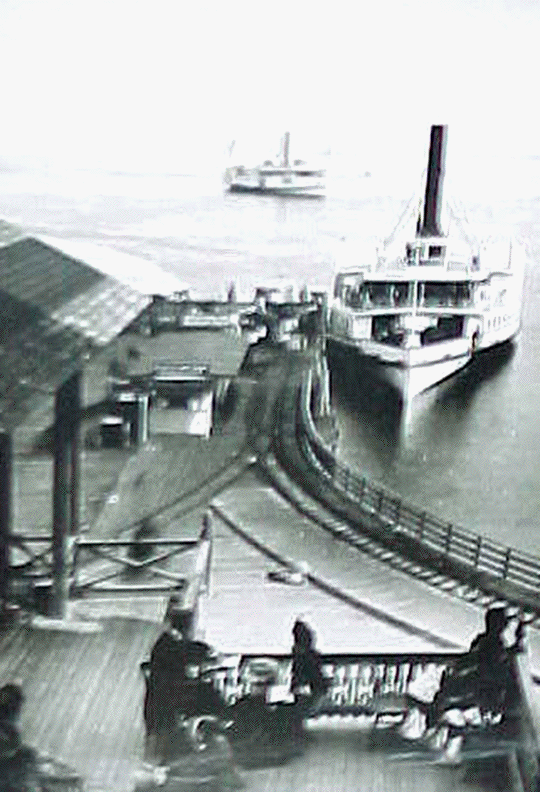
Engine turnaround in Oak Bluffs

The railroad ran into financial problems almost immediately. By 1877 the operation of the line was temporarily turned over to the principal debt holders until it returned to solvency. However the financial problems continued and in 1890 the railroad was placed into receivership. In 1892 a fire destroyed the Sea View House, the wooden ferry dock and the track triangle. Since there was no budget for the reconstruction of the triangle, the train went backwards from Oak Bluffs to Katama.

== Sale and closure ==
In early 1892 the railroad was sold to the Old Colony Steamboat Company, the subsidiary of the Old Colony Railroad that operated the steamships to Oak Bluffs. They in turn sold the line to Joseph M. Wardell who became its general manager. The railroad continued to operate at a loss and finally closed in 1896.

== Locomotives ==
Name	Builder	Type	Date	Works number	Notes
Active	H.K. Porter	0-6-0 tender	April 1874	201	Later renamed Edgartown then South Beach
