= Hoosac Tunnel and Wilmington Railroad =

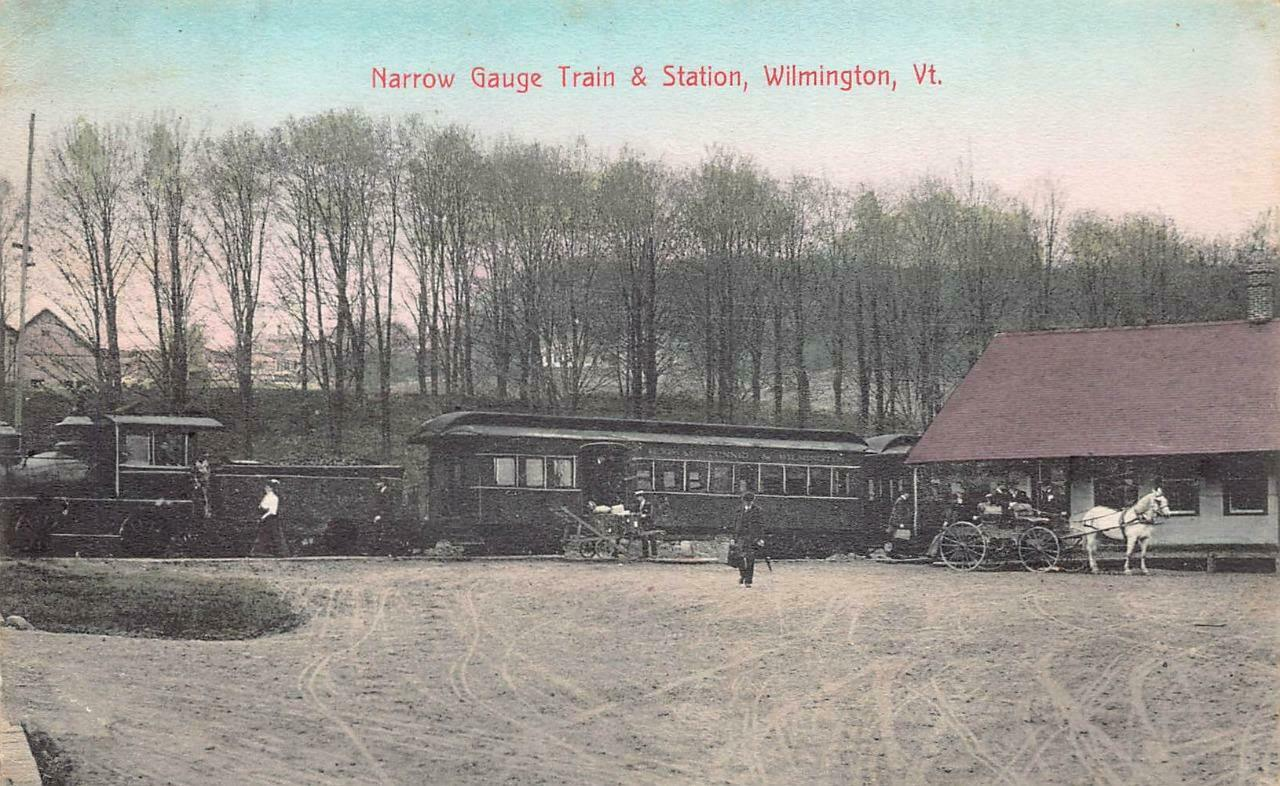
- Postcard view of a train at Wilmington around 1910

Overview
- Headquarters: Wilmington, Vermont (1884-1937); Readsboro, Vermont (1937-1971)
- Locale: Massachusetts and Vermont
- Dates of operation: 1886–1971
- Predecessor: Deerfield River Railroad

Technical
- Track gauge: 4 ft 8 1/2 in (1,435 mm) standard gauge
- Previous gauge: 3 ft (914 mm)
- Length: 25 mi (40 km)

The Hoosac Tunnel and Wilmington Railroad (HTW) was an interstate shortline railroad running north–south between southwestern Vermont and northwestern Massachusetts. It ran from Wilmington, Vermont to Rowe, Massachusetts, a distance of approximately 25 miles (40 km). In Rowe, passengers could transfer to the east–west mainline of the Fitchburg Railroad.

== History ==
The legislatures of Vermont and Massachusetts granted a charter to construct the Deerfield Valley Railroad in 1884, and a 3 ft (914 mm) narrow gauge railroad was constructed over the 11 miles (18 km) from Hoosac Tunnel to Readsboro, Vermont by 1885. In 1886 control of the trackage in Massachusetts was transferred to the Hoosac Tunnel and Wilmington Railroad. However, the final 14 miles (23 km) of track to Wilmington were not laid until 1892, when control of the entire line was transferred to the HT&W.

In 1913 the line was converted to 4 ft 8 1/2 in (1,435 mm) standard gauge, though an array of over 40 miles (64 km) of logging railroads that were laid at various times near Wilmington and Readsboro remained narrow gauge. The railroad was used to haul materials for the Somerset Dam in 1911, and the Harriman Dam in 1924, both of which were owned by the New England Power Company, which purchased the railroad in 1920. Originally the power company did not want to relocate the portion of the railroad flooded by the Harriman Dam, but was forced to by the citizens of Wilmington. The power company sold the railroad to local investors in 1928, who operated the railroad until a major flood in 1936 destroyed a bridge near Mountain Mills in Vermont. The railroad was sold again at that time, and the portion north of Readsboro was abandoned in 1937. Operations continued on the remaining portion until 1971, when the line was finally abandoned.

Before 2011, the northern 18 miles (29 km) of the HT&W roadbed were converted for use as a rail trail.

== Stations ==
=== Massachusetts ===
- Hoosac Tunnel
- Logan's
- Heywood's
- Monroe Bridge

=== Vermont ===
- Sherman
- Readsboro
- Whittingham
- Jacksonville
- Mountain Mills
- Wilmington

Popular nicknames for the HT&W included "the Hoot, Toot, and Whistle" and the "hold tight and whimper."
