= The Crackpots and These Women =

- The West Wing episode
- Episode no.: Season 1 Episode 5
- Directed by: Anthony Drazan
- Written by: Aaron Sorkin
- Production code: 225904
- Original air date: October 20, 1999

Guest appearances
- Guy Boyd as Stanley; Janel Moloney as Donna Moss; Elisabeth Moss as Zoey Bartlet; Suzy Nakamura as Cathy; Renee Estevez as Nancy; Sam Lloyd as Bob; Nick Offerman as Jerry; Juwan Howard as Rodney Grant

Episode chronology
← Previous "Five Votes Down"	Next → "Mr. Willis of Ohio"
- The West Wing season 1

"The Crackpots and These Women" is the fifth episode from season one of The West Wing. The episode aired on October 20, 1999, on NBC.

== Plot ==
The staff participates in "Big Block of Cheese Day", a fictional workday on which White House Chief of Staff Leo McGarry encourages his staff to meet with fringe special interest groups that normally would not get attention from the White House. Big Block of Cheese Day also is mentioned in "Somebody's Going to Emergency, Somebody's Going to Jail".

The rationale for the day, as recounted by McGarry (much to the consternation of the senior staff), is that America's seventh president, Andrew Jackson, had a two-ton block of cheese in the White House foyer from which everyone was welcome to eat. This symbolized the openness of the White House to the American people. White House Communications Director Toby Ziegler derisively refers to the day as "Throw Open Our Office Doors To People Who Want To Discuss Things That We Could [sic] Care Less About Day", and Deputy Chief of Staff Josh Lyman refers to it as "Total Crackpot Day".

White House Press Secretary C. J. Cregg meets with a group about building a highway for wolves, while Sam Seaborn meets with a representative of the United States Space Command, played by Sam Lloyd, concerned about UFOs.

Josh is given a card from the National Security Council with information about where he is to go in the event of a nuclear attack and becomes riddled with guilt after realizing that nobody else on the staff was given one. He visits his therapist and reveals that his older sister died in a house fire while babysitting him, and that he survived by running out of the house.

Later, President Bartlet hosts a reception in the Residence for his youngest daughter, Zoey, who is scouting colleges in the D.C. area. (Earlier in the day, upon learning of her visit, the President announces to everyone that he will make chili for them all.) In a private conversation, the President, Leo and Josh marvel at the extraordinary strength and integrity of the women in their lives. During the party, Josh returns his NSC card to the President, explaining that he just wants to be with his friends through everything and to be able to look them in the eye in the meantime.

== Real-life inspiration ==
=== The Cheshire Mammoth Cheese ===
The Cheshire Mammoth Cheese was first made by John Leland and presented to President Thomas Jefferson on January 1, 1802. Leland considered the cheese an act of "profound respect ... to the popular ratification of his election". The book Real Life at the White House confirms that this story draws on actual events. Supporters of Andrew Jackson, not wanting Jefferson to outshine him, in 1837 sent Jackson a gift of a 4-foot-diameter (1.2 m) wheel of cheese, estimated at 17 inches (43 cm) thick, weighing about 1,325 pounds (600 kg). The cheese was retained for several years, with pieces being pulled off and discarded as it rotted; but some was capable of consumption and was served at presidential dinners until the remains were disposed of, most likely by being dumped into the Potomac River. Recalling one such dinner, Senator William Plumer remarked that the "dinner was elegant and rich", but noting the cheese, then more than three years old, was an exception; he described it as "very far from being good".

=== Animals on highways ===
In one of his earliest roles, Nick Offerman played an animal rights activist in this episode that proposed the construction of an "1800 mile wolves-only roadway". There have actually been efforts to construct wildlife crossings and wildlife corridors to allow animals to cross highways without being struck by passing vehicles. In fact, the entire program proposed has been implemented as the Y2Y initiative (Yellowstone to Yukon) which links the Yukon with Yellowstone National Park using a series of corridors and highway crossings. The story of "Pluie" the wolf is true and served as the inspiration for the program.

=== NSC card ===
Josh's dilemma with the card given to him was inspired by George Stephanopoulos showing Aaron Sorkin his card issued by the NSC showing him where he was to go in the event of an attack. In the script book, Sorkin reveals that former White House press secretary Dee Dee Myers pulled him to one side and said that the cards did not exist, not realizing that she had simply not been issued one.

== Cameo ==
In the pre-credit sequence, members of the staff are shown playing a pickup basketball game on Pennsylvania Avenue. President Bartlet calls for a substitute, Rodney Grant. Grant is identified by Bartlet as an "associate director of the President's Council on Physical Fitness". Upon further questioning, Grant says that he played basketball at Duke University. Grant was played by Juwan Howard, who in real life played at the University of Michigan. At the time of the episode, Howard was a member of the Washington Wizards.

== See also ==
- "Somebody's Going to Emergency, Somebody's Going to Jail", the next Big Block of Cheese Day
