= Adams station (New York Central Railroad) =

Adams
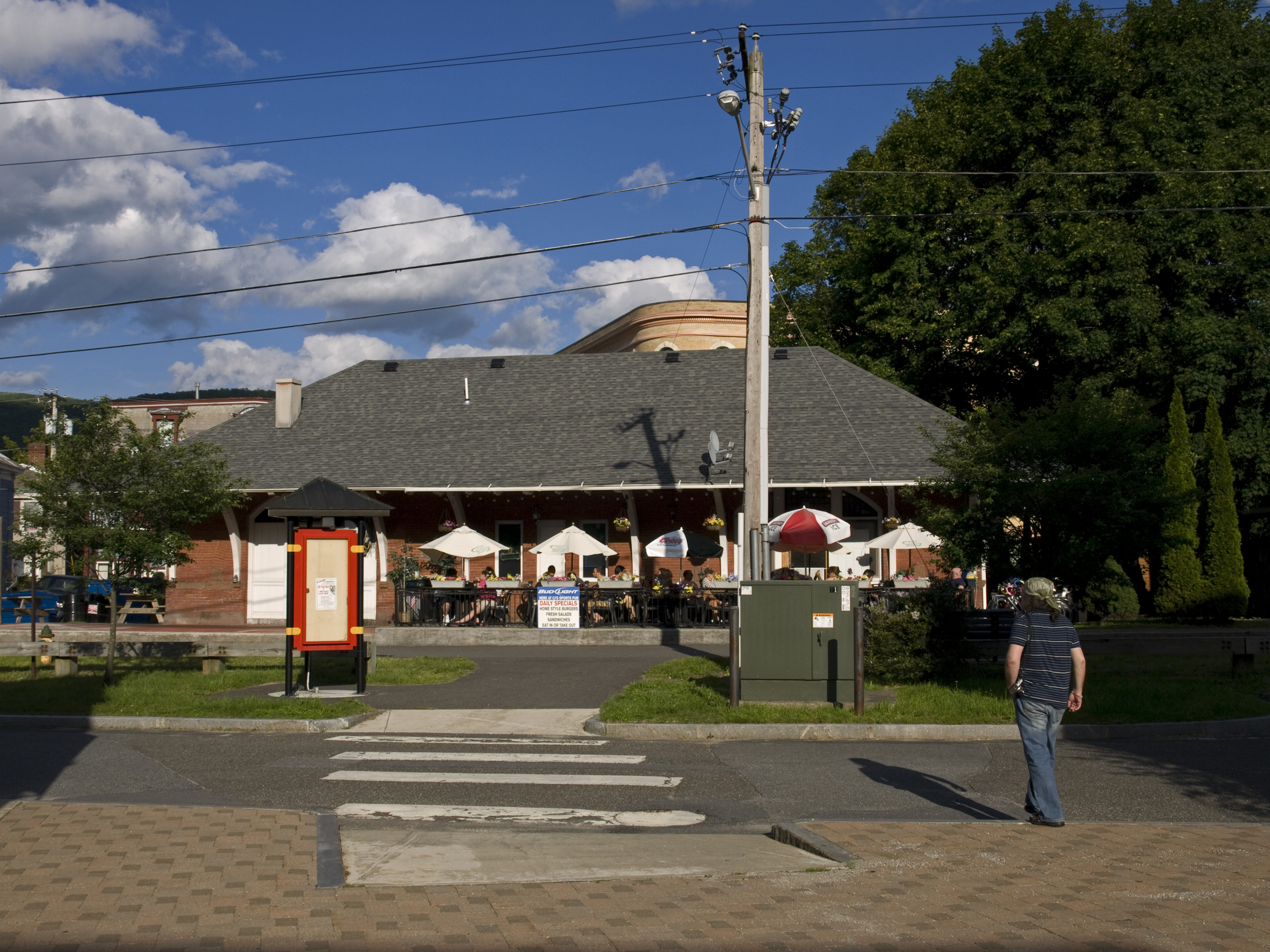
- The former Adams station building in 2013

General information
- Location: 10 Pleasant Street, Adams, Massachusetts
- Coordinates: 42°37′18.4722″N 73°7′8.6442″W
- Line: North Adams Branch

Construction
- Architectural style: Queen Anne, Romanesque

History
- Opened: 1889

Former services
Preceding station	New York Central Railroad	Following station
Cheshire toward Pittsfield	North Adams Branch	Renfrew toward North Adams
- Pittsfield & North Adams Passenger Station and Baggage & Express House
- U.S. National Register of Historic Places
- NRHP reference No.: 82004950
- Added to NRHP: April 1, 1982
Location

Adams is a former train station at 10 Pleasant Street in Adams, Massachusetts. Built in 1899, it served as the town's principal rail station on the North Adams Branch of the Boston and Albany Railroad until the mid-20th century. The surviving buildings were listed on the National Register of Historic Places in 1982 as the Pittsfield & North Adams Passenger Station and Baggage & Express House. The former station is currently the home of a sports bar and restaurant.

== Description and history ==
The former Pittsfield & North Adams Passenger Station and Baggage & Express House stand just east of Adams' central business district, on the west side of Pleasant Street opposite its junction with Spring Street. The two buildings are oriented with respect to the former railroad right of way (now the Ashuwillticook Rail Trail), which runs at an angle to Pleasant Street. The passenger station is a single-story brick building with a shallow hip roof with very deep eaves that are supported by large brackets. Its doors and windows are all round-arched. The baggage house is a more utilitarian wood frame structure, with a gabled roof and clapboarded exterior.

The Pittsfield and North Adams Railroad inaugurated service through Adams in 1845-46. The present buildings were built by that railroad between 1889 and 1894. The railroad was eventually folded into the Boston and Albany Railroad, which continued operations through the mid-20th century. The New York Central Railroad leased the B&A lines and it operated the Berkshire Hills Express and other trains between North Adams and New York City through Adams.

The passenger depot has been adaptively reused as a commercial space. The tracks have been removed; the space previously occupied by track has been paved and converted into a pedestrian walk.

== See also ==
- National Register of Historic Places listings in Berkshire County, Massachusetts
