= Pittsfield and North Adams Railroad =

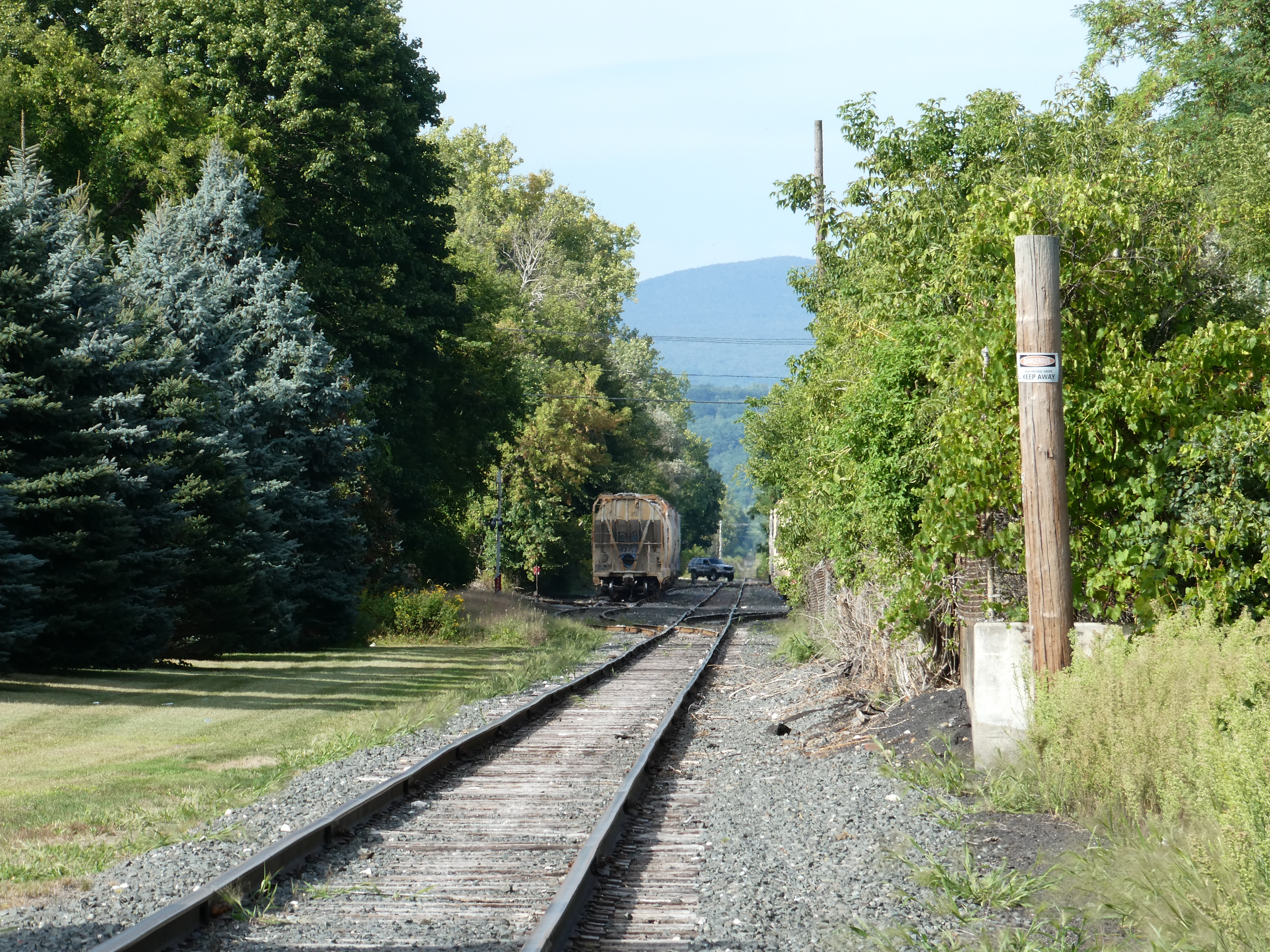
- Remaining trackage in Adams in 2022

Overview
- Locale: Western Massachusetts
- Termini: North Adams, Massachusetts; Pittsfield, Massachusetts

Service
- System: Boston and Albany Railroad

History
- Opened: December 1, 1846

Technical
- Track gauge: 1,435 mm (4 ft 8 1/2 in)

The Pittsfield and North Adams Railroad was a railroad based in northwestern Massachusetts. It was chartered in 1842 and was purchased by the Western Railroad of Massachusetts before construction was finished in 1846, then acquired by the Boston and Albany Railroad in 1870, only to face a gradual demise between the 1960s and 1990. It ran 18.539 mi (29.836 km) from North Adams Junction in Pittsfield to North Adams, where it connected to the Troy and Greenfield Railroad, an affiliate of the Fitchburg Railroad.

== History ==
The Pittsfield and North Adams was incorporated on March 3, 1842, by special act of the State of Massachusetts. The original owners of the P&NA developed this corridor with the goal of extending the Housatonic Railroad (1836) north to Rutland, Vermont. It was organized December 18, 1845 and opened for operation on December 1, 1846. Before the tracks were under construction, the company was acquired by the Western Railroad of Massachusetts, which allowed the Housatonic to use the line until the Western Railroad became part of the Boston and Albany Railroad (B&A) on November 2, 1870, as their North Adams Branch. Mineral traffic developed on the line and a number of limestone operations went into business. The New York Central Railroad took over the B&A in 1900, and upgraded the line, although it allowed the B&A and its branches to operate under its old name. Brochures and schedules of the New York Central made the North Adams Branch seem as if it were a segment of the Harlem Division, despite the fact that the aforementioned line terminated at Chatham Union Station in New York. Some brochures with this extension actually pre-date the purchase of the B&A by NYC.

In 1961, the B&A name was officially phased out, making the North Adams Branch into a branch of the NYC. Along with the rest of the New York Central, the line was merged with the Pennsylvania Railroad in 1968 to form Penn Central Railroad, which faced bankruptcy within two years. Penn Central was bought out by Conrail in 1976, and kept the North Adams Branch intact, until they sold the branch to the Boston and Maine Corporation in 1981. Despite the connection to an existing track in North Adams, Boston and Maine ran the line with declining success. The 1983 purchase of B&M by Guilford Transportation Industries had no effect on the line, so it was abandoned in 1990. Seeing the potential for recreational use of the corridor, local citizens organized to preserve the right-of-way, eventually gaining the local and political support needed to convert much of the line into the Ashuwillticook Rail Trail. Surviving structures along this branch include former stations in Cheshire, Adams, and North Adams.

== Station list ==
The entire line was in Berkshire County, Massachusetts

Locality	Miles (kilometers) to Pittsfield	Station	Station link	Lat/long	Notes/Connections
Pittsfield	0.00	Pittsfield			Amtrak Lake Shore Limited; Junction with Stockbridge and Pittsfield Railroad (NYNH&H). Replaced by Amtrak station.
Pittsfield		North Adams Junction			Junction with B&A Main Line.
Pittsfield		Coltsville			Coltsville was an independent village annexed by Pittsfield.
Berkshire		Berkshire			
Farnams		Farnhams			Now in the Farnams Village Historic District
Cheshire		Cheshire		42°33′38.6″N 73°9′30.66″W	Presently a local auto repair shop.
Cheshire		Cheshire Harbor			
Maple Grove		Maple Grove			
Adams		Adams		42°37′18.47″N 73°7′8.65″W	NRHP since April 1, 1982.
Renfrew		Renfrew			
Zylonite		Zylonite			
North Adams	18.539	North Adams			Junction with Troy and Greenfield Railroad (B&M); Currently part of the Freight Yard Historic District at Western Gateway Heritage State Park.
Northern terminus at Fitchburg Railroad T&G Branch
