= Farnams Village Historic District =

Historic district in Massachusetts, United States

- U.S. National Register of Historic Places
- U.S. Historic district
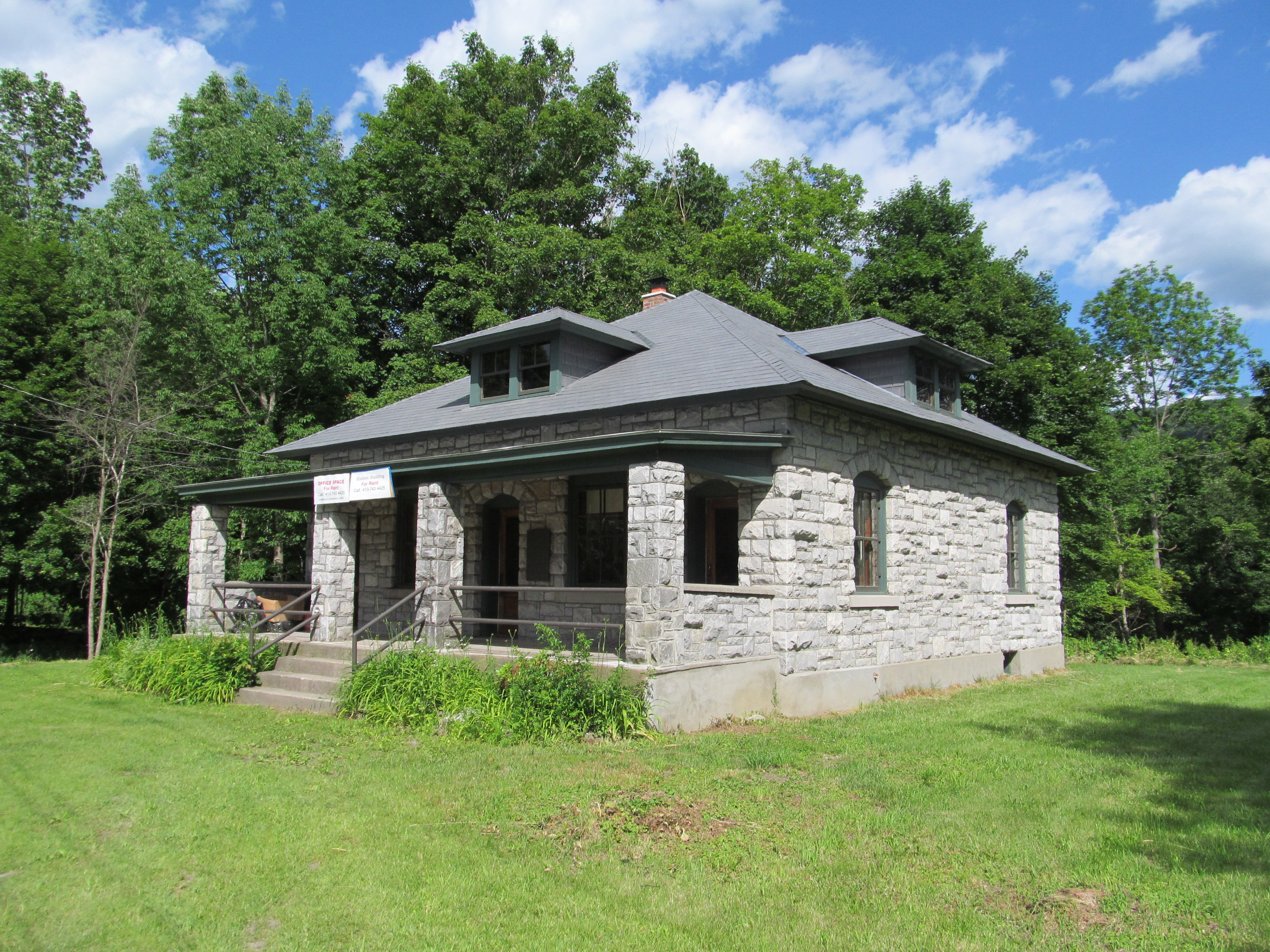
- Former paymaster's building, corner of Lanesborough and Farnam Roads

- Location within Massachusetts Location within the United States
- Location: Lanesboro, Quarry and Farnam Rds., Cheshire, Massachusetts
- Coordinates: 42°32′44″N 73°11′31″W
- Area: 1,400 acres (570 ha)
- Architectural style: Greek Revival, Gothic
- NRHP reference No.: 99000866
- Added to NRHP: April 27, 2000

Farnams Village Historic District is a historic district in Cheshire, Massachusetts, United States. It encompasses the historic limestone mining community known as Farnams Village and the associated surviving industrial and mining infrastructure associated with a mining operation active from the late 19th century into the mid-20th century. The main village area is centered on Lanesborough Road in southern Cheshire, near Farnams and Quarry Roads, with quarry sites on the hillside to the west. The district was listed on the National Register of Historic Places in 2000.

== Description and history ==
Farnams Village is located in southern Cheshire, a rural town on the eastern slope of Mount Greylock in western Massachusetts. The geology of southwestern Cheshire includes ridges of outcrops with deposits of limestone and marble, which were mined on a small scale, primarily for local use by farmers, beginning in the early 19th century. The arrival of railroad infrastructure in the area in the mid-19th century prompted a more organized expansion of mining efforts. The Dean family were one of the first to establish a small mining operation (c. 1840), located roughly at the western end of Quarry Road. Brothers Alfred and Albert Farnam in 1874 opened a lime processing facility, and greatly expanded mining in an area adjacent to the small Dean mine. The Farnams were economically successful, producing a high quality white plaster lime, and eventually expanded their holdings to more than 1,500 acres (610 ha). They overextended their finances in the process, and sold the business in 1905. The business was acquired by US Gypsum in 1927, and operated until 1969, when it was closed down.

The historic district covers a total of 1,400 acres (570 ha). The center of the district is the historic village center, at the junction of Lanesborough, Farnams, and Quarry Roads, where there stand a cluster of buildings, including worker housing and buildings related to the operation of the quarries. The district also includes the quarries and abandoned quarry equipment, former mining structures, worker housing, and public facilities of the village. There are significant areas of primarily industrial archeological interest, due to the large number of abandoned and destroyed buildings.

== See also ==
- National Register of Historic Places listings in Berkshire County, Massachusetts
