= North Bellingham Cemetery and Oak Hill Cemetery =

Historic site in Norfolk County, Massachusetts, US

- U.S. National Register of Historic Places
- U.S. Historic district
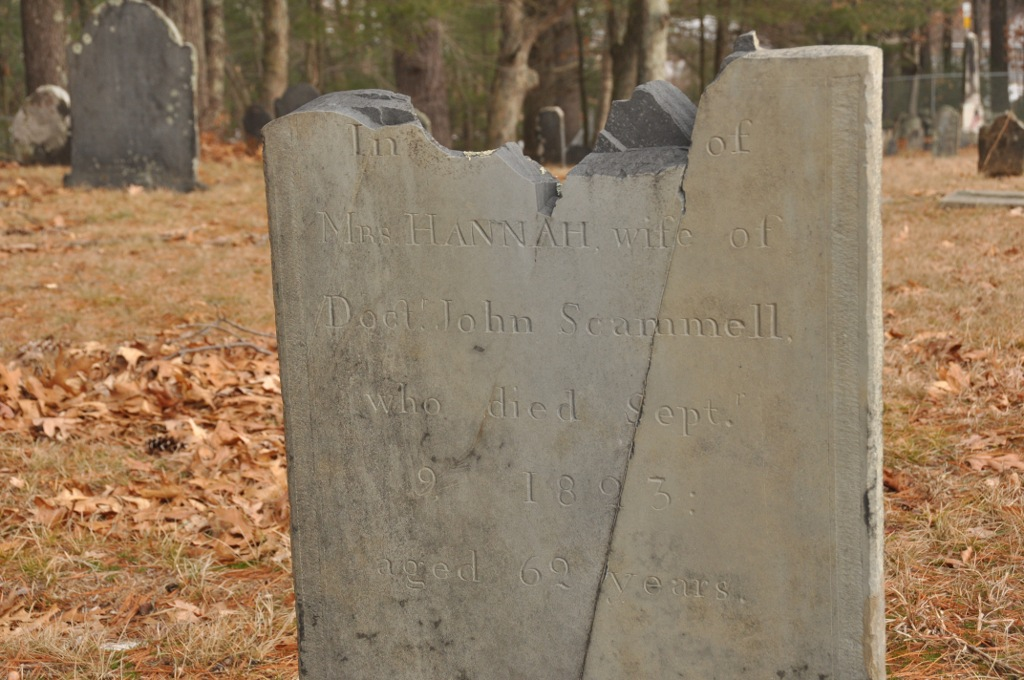
- An 1823 grave marker in North Bellingham Cemetery

- Location within Massachusetts Location within the United States
- Location: Bellingham, Massachusetts
- Coordinates: 42°07′1″N 71°27′34″W
- NRHP reference No.: 12000819
- Added to NRHP: September 25, 2012

The North Bellingham Cemetery and Oak Hill Cemetery are a pair of adjacent cemeteries in Bellingham, Massachusetts. They are located on the north side of Hartford Avenue (Massachusetts Route 126) a short way east of its junction with Interstate 495. The municipally owned North Bellingham Cemetery is a roughly 1 acre (0.40 ha) plot, and is the oldest cemetery in the town, holding the graves of many of the town's founders. Its earliest recorded burial was in 1712, and the last was in 1888. Oak Hill Cemetery, a still-active cemetery, is a privately owned 2.5-acre (1.0 ha) parcel established in 1849. The two cemeteries combine to show the full range of changing funerary tastes from colonial days to the present.

The cemeteries were listed on the National Register of Historic Places in 2012.

== See also ==
- National Register of Historic Places listings in Norfolk County, Massachusetts
