= Cheshire Crown Glass Company =

American glass company

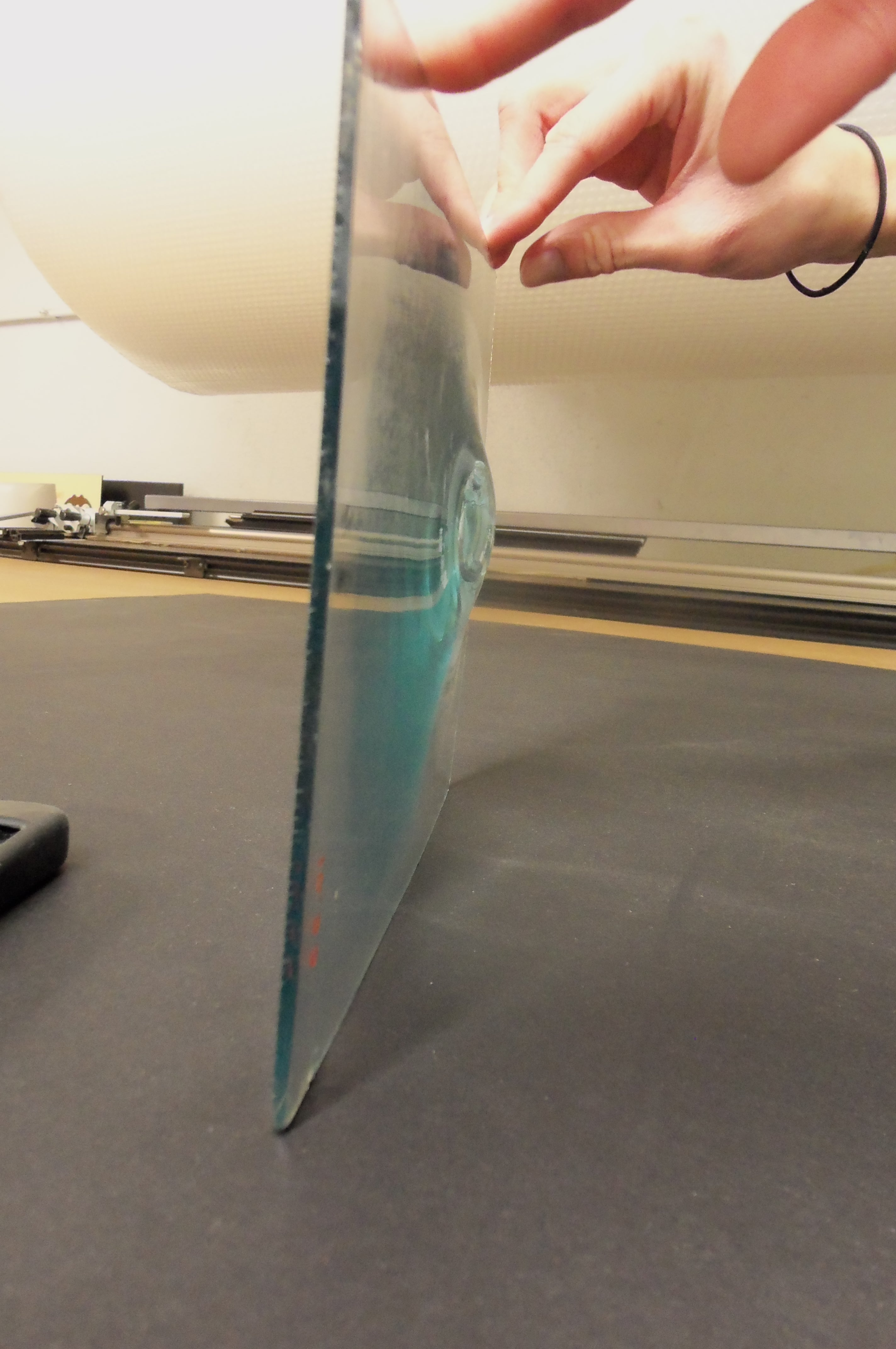
Center piece (crown) of original Cheshire crown glass from 1813. Now part of Berkshire Museum collection. Photo by Barry Emery

The Cheshire Crown Glass Company was established in 1812 in Cheshire, Massachusetts, to take advantage of the high-quality sand (silica) in the area. The company was organized by Darius Brown, John Brown, John D. Leland, Ambrose Kasson, and John Hunt, and incorporated in an act approved by Massachusetts Governor Marcus Morton on February 25, 1815. The capitalist behind the company, Captain Daniel Brown (father to Darius and John), ran a store and distillery in conjunction with the glass works.

The company produced crown glass for windows, using sand from the "Lane bed" in nearby Lanesborough, Massachusetts. However, the company was not successful, and closed down only a few years later in 1816. Unknown to the owners of the Cheshire Crown Glass Company, the factory was built over sand of even finer quality than that of the Lane bed. This bed of sand was discovered under the ruins of the factory in 1845, and led to the founding of the Berkshire Glass Company.
