= Cheshire Town Hall Complex =

- U.S. National Register of Historic Places
- U.S. Historic district
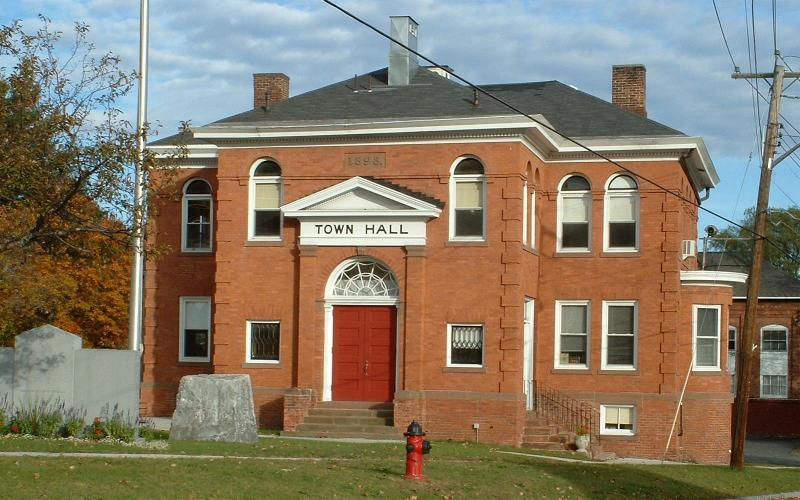
- Cheshire Town Hall

- Location within Massachusetts Location within the United States
- Location: 80–84 Church & 23 Depot Sts., Cheshire, Massachusetts
- Coordinates: 42°33′43″N 73°9′46″W
- Area: less than one acre
- Built: 1898
- Architect: Emory A. Ellsworth
- Architectural style: Colonial Revival
- NRHP reference No.: 100000719
- Added to NRHP: March 7, 2017

The Cheshire Town Hall Complex is a three-building set of municipal structures at the junction of Church and Depot Streets in Cheshire, Massachusetts. Built in 1898, the town hall is a prominent local example of Colonial Revival architecture, and the assemblage form an imposing civic statement in the village center. The buildings were listed on the National Register of Historic Places in 2017.

== Description and history ==
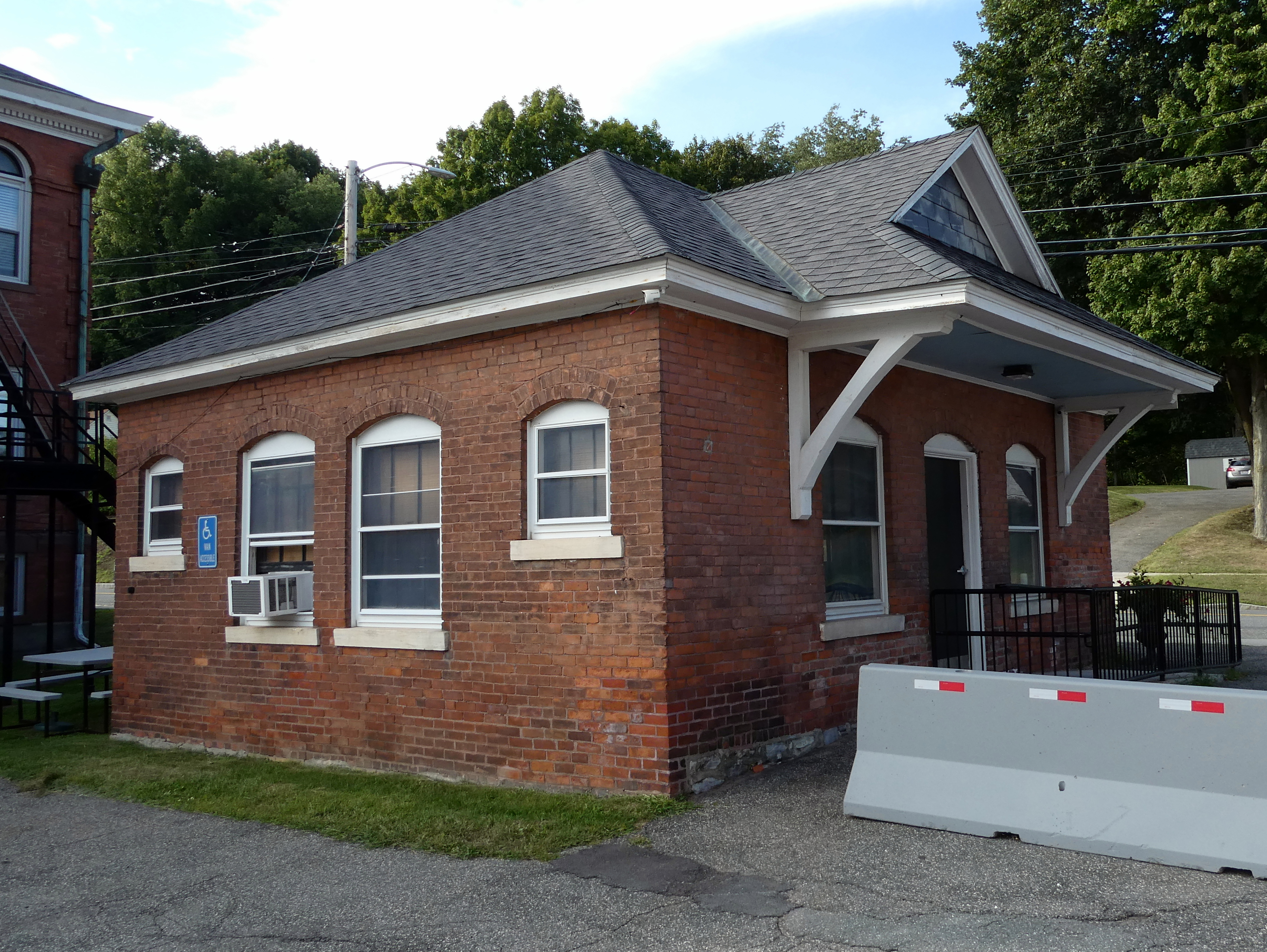
The former streetcar station in 2022

The town of Cheshire is a small rural community in central Berkshire County, Massachusetts. Its main village is located near the western bank of the Hoosic River, just north of the Cheshire Reservoir. Its municipal complex is located on a triangular parcel bounded on the north by Church Street and the south by Depot Street. Prominently facing the intersection is the town hall and library, a cruciform two-story brick building with a hip roof and Colonial Revival features . Just behind it is a small single-story building housing the building department offices, whose originally function was as a ticket office and waiting room for the local street car. Across the parking lot, at the eastern end of the property, is a two-story brick building, which formerly housed the trolley power station but now houses the town police and fire offices. The parking area is where the Berkshire Street Railway originally turned around. In the triangular grassy area at the front of the town hall is a memorial fountain to the town's Revolutionary War participation, and there is also a monument honoring the town's World War I soldiers.

The town's 19th-century town hall, a wood-frame building, was located on State Road near the Baptist church; it is no longer standing. This town hall was built in 1898, after the state mandated town records be stored in fireproof vaults. At the same time, the Cheshire Library Association, a private library founded in 1866, was seeking a larger space for its collection. The new building was designed by Emory A. Ellsworth, a Holyoke architect. The two former trolley buildings were built sometime after 1904, for service that had been inaugurated in 1902. Service on that line was discontinued in 1932, and the town purchased the two buildings in 1935. The ticket office became the town post office in 1937, and served that role until 1971. The power building was occupied by the town's fire and police functions in 1935.

== See also ==
- National Register of Historic Places listings in Berkshire County, Massachusetts
