= Bellingham, Massachusetts =

- Town
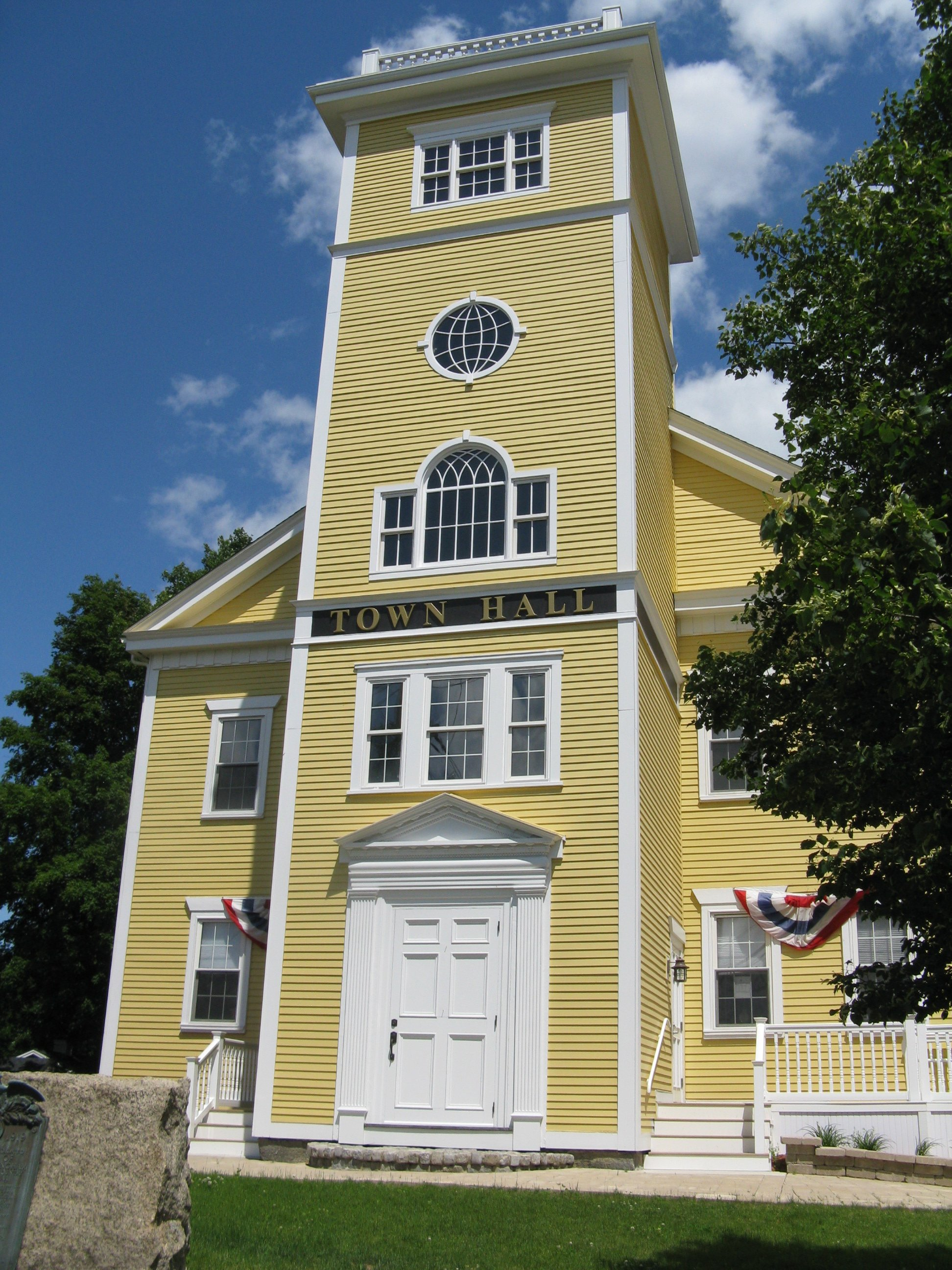
- Bellingham Town Hall

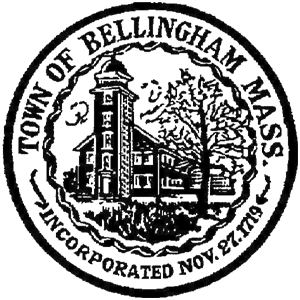
- Seal

- Location in Norfolk County in Massachusetts
- Coordinates: 42°05′12″N 71°28′30″W
- Country: United States
- State: Massachusetts
- County: Norfolk
- Settled: 1713
- Incorporated: 1719

Government
  - Type: Open town meeting

Area
  - Total: 19.0 sq mi (49.2 km^{2})
  - Land: 18.5 sq mi (47.9 km^{2})
  - Water: 0.50 sq mi (1.3 km^{2})
- Elevation: 292 ft (89 m)

Population (2020)
  - Total: 16,945
  - Density: 916/sq mi (354/km^{2})
- Time zone: UTC−5 (Eastern)
  - Summer (DST): UTC−4 (Eastern)
- ZIP Code: 02019
- Area code: 508/774
- FIPS code: 25-04930
- GNIS feature ID: 0618315
- Website: www.bellinghamma.org

Bellingham (/ˈbɛlɪŋˌhæ̃m/) is a town in Norfolk County, Massachusetts, United States. The population was 16,945 at the 2020 census. The town sits on the southwestern fringe of Metropolitan Boston, along the rapidly growing "outer belt" that is Interstate 495. It is formally a part of the Boston–Cambridge–Quincy metropolitan statistical area, as well as the Providence metropolitan area.

For geographic and demographic information on the census-designated place Bellingham, please see the article Bellingham (CDP), Massachusetts.

== History ==
The area of the town south of the Charles River constituted the southwestern corner of the Dedham Grant, which sprouted much of what has become Norfolk County. The land was swampy, and the town of Dedham did not believe it worthy of settlement. The area north of the river would be purchased by Edward Rawson, and due to the settlement of borders with the surrounding communities, these two areas would eventually merge. Most of the land to be called Bellingham was originally a portion of Dedham. The first land bought in Bellingham that was Dedham was purchased in 1696 by a man who believed that that government is best which governs least. By 1713, there were enough citizens to warrant village meetings in the area. By 1718, the village petitioned for separation, and the town officially incorporated on November 27, 1719. The village was originally named "Westham" (short for "West Dedham"), but at the time of incorporation, its name was changed to Bellingham without record of the benefactor. The town is named for Richard Bellingham, an early governor of the Massachusetts Bay Colony.

The town was founded with a Pilgrim (Congregationalist) meeting house, like all the towns in the colony at the time. However, this church would dissolve before the middle of the century, replaced with a Baptist church. John Leland, a Baptist minister, who was a major supporter of James Madison and the First Amendment to the Constitution, was baptized in Bellingham's Baptist church in 1775. The town grew slowly, given the terrain and the limited resources. During the Industrial Revolution, several man-made ponds were constructed to support industry in land that had been swamp. Today the northern part of the town is part of the economic boom along I-495, with the southern being mostly suburban. Deborah Sampson enlisted as "Robert Shurtlieff" at Bellingham, near the end of the Revolutionary War, and disguised herself as a man, to become America's first woman soldier.

== Geography and transportation ==
According to the United States Census Bureau, the town has a total area of 19.0 square miles (49.2 km^{2}), of which 18.5 square miles (47.9 km^{2}) is land and 0.5 square mile (1.3 km^{2}) (2.58%) is water. The town's mean elevation is 293 feet (89 m) above sea level.

Bellingham is located at the southwestern corner of Norfolk County, just northwest of the northeastern corner of Rhode Island. It is bordered by Medway on the north, Franklin to the east, Wrentham to the southeast; Woonsocket, Rhode Island, on the south; and Blackstone, Hopedale and Mendon to the west, and Milford to the northwest. Bellingham is 23 miles (37 km) southeast of Worcester, 30 miles (50 km) southwest of Boston, and 20 miles (30 km) north of Providence.

Interstate 495 runs across the northern end of town, with only one exit in the town itself, Exit 46 (Formerly 18) at Hartford Avenue (Rte. 126). Exits 41 and 43 (Formerly 16 and 17) in Franklin are just a few miles from the town line. 3 miles (5 km) State Route 126 runs north to south from the town of Medway to the Rhode Island border. State Route 140 runs east to west from Franklin to Mendon. The town went from having no traffic lights in the late 1980s to well over a dozen in 2006.

The nearest public transit is Forge Park/495 station on the MBTA Commuter Rail Franklin/Foxboro Line, located about 2 miles (3.2 km) outside Bellingham. There is also a RIPTA bus that stops about 1 mile (1.6 km) away in Woonsocket, RI.

== Demographics ==
Historical population
Year	Pop.	±%
1790	735	—
1850	1,281	+74.3%
1860	1,313	+2.5%
1870	1,282	−2.4%
1880	1,223	−4.6%
1890	1,334	+9.1%
1900	1,682	+26.1%
1910	1,096	−34.8%
1920	2,102	+91.8%
1930	3,189	+51.7%
1940	2,979	−6.6%
1950	4,100	+37.6%
1960	6,774	+65.2%
1970	13,967	+106.2%
1980	14,300	+2.4%
1990	14,877	+4.0%
2000	15,314	+2.9%
2010	16,332	+6.6%
2020	16,945	+3.8%
2024*	17,998	+6.2%
* = population estimate. Source: United States census records and Population Estimates Program data.

As of the census of 2000, there were 15,314 people, 5,557 households, and 4,284 families residing in the town. The population density was 827.8 inhabitants per square mile (319.6/km^{2}). There were 5,642 housing units at an average density of 305.0 per square mile (117.8/km^{2}). The racial makeup of the town was 96.93% White, 0.91% Black, 0.12% American Indian, 0.86% Asian, 0.03% Pacific Islander, 0.30% from other races, and 0.84% from two or more races. Hispanic or Latino of any race were 1.20% of the population.

65.53% of the people in Bellingham are religious, meaning they affiliate with a religion. 54.17% are Catholic; 6.63% are Baptist; 0.19% are LDS; 0.87% are of another Christian faith; 2.98% are Jewish; 0.26% are an Eastern faith; 0.70% are affiliated with Islam. There are a number of meetinghouses in Bellingham; two Catholic churches, St. Blaise and St. Brendan's; three Baptist churches, Bellingham Bible Baptist, Milford Bible Baptist and First Baptist; and one Hindu temple the Boston Sri Kalikambal Shiva Temple. People of Buddhist, Jewish, Mennonite, Mormon, or Muslim faiths meet in neighboring towns for worship.

There were 5,557 households, out of which 37.9% had children under the age of 18 living with them, 64.6% were married couples living together, 8.9% had a female householder with no husband present, and 22.9% were non-families. 18.2% of all households were made up of individuals, and 6.1% had someone living alone who was 65 years of age or older. The average household size was 2.75 and the average family size was 3.15.

In the town, the population was spread out, with 26.8% under the age of 18, 5.6% from 18 to 24, 34.6% from 25 to 44, 23.3% from 45 to 64, and 9.7% who were 65 years of age or older. The median age was 36 years. For every 100 females, there were 96.1 males. For every 100 females age 18 and over, there were 94.2 males.

The median income for a household in the town was $103,258. The per capita income for the town was $44,236. 2020 Census quick facts About 1.6% of families and 2.5% of the population were below the poverty line, including 2.5% of those under age 18 and 6.0% of those age 65 or over.

=== Crime ===
The FBI Crime Database states that out of Massachusetts' 279 cities and towns, Bellingham was ranked 87th in Most Property Damage per 100,000 in 2013. However, it was ranked 122nd for Most Burglaries per 100,000. Some of the cities with the highest crime rates in the state include Fall River and Springfield. There are also 7 confirmed sex offenders living in Bellingham as of 2015.

== Education ==
As of 2024, there are two elementary schools (Stallbrook, and DiPietro), one middle school (Bellingham Memorial), and two high schools (Bellingham High School and Keough Memorial Academy). The Clara Macy Elementary school was closed before the start of the 2015–2016 school year and was demolished the following year. The children who attended Clara Macy school in the 2014–2015 school year were divided geographically between the remaining two elementary schools. Joseph F. DiPietro Elementary School was formally known as South Elementary school for the majority of its history. In 2019, Bellingham High School ranked 205 in Massachusetts as a result many families elect to school choice to nearby towns of Medway and Holliston or go to private and technical schools, Tri-County in Franklin, Blackstone Valley Tech in Upton, and Mount St. Charles in Woonsocket, RI. Bellingham High's sports teams have competed in the Tri-Valley League since the leagues induction in 1966. Bellingham is known for producing good baseball, softball and football teams and are not considered an easy win in other sports by the other members of the league.

== Cemeteries ==
- Precious Blood & St. John, 314 Wrentham Rd
- St. John's Cemetery, 310 Wrentham Rd
- Ukrainian-American Cemetery, 128 Center St
- Union Cemetery, 84 Mechanic St
- North Cemetery and Oak Hill Cemetery, Hartford Ave

== Notable people ==
- William Taylor Adams (1822–1897), author under the name "Oliver Optic" is from nearby Medway
- Bathsheba A. Benedict, founder of Benedict College
- Geoff Bodine, NASCAR Driver
- Robert Austin Boudreau, (1927–2024), founder and music director of the American Wind Symphony Orchestra
- Levi Cook, mayor of Detroit
- Jason DeLucia, mixed martial artist
- John Leland, Baptist minister, baptized in Bellingham in 1774
- Debbie Mueller, pioneer female road runner, winner of Dublin Marathon
- Deborah Sampson, "America's first woman soldier" enlisted for service in the Revolutionary War at Bellingham
- Ricky Santos, American football player signed by the Kansas City Chiefs but spent the majority of his career playing in the CFL
- John Milton Thayer, Union Army general, US Senator from Nebraska
- Jorge Riviera, mixed martial artist, UFC middleweight contender

== See also ==
- National Register of Historic Places listings in Norfolk County, Massachusetts
