= Ashuwillticook Rail Trail =

Rail trail in Massachusetts, United States

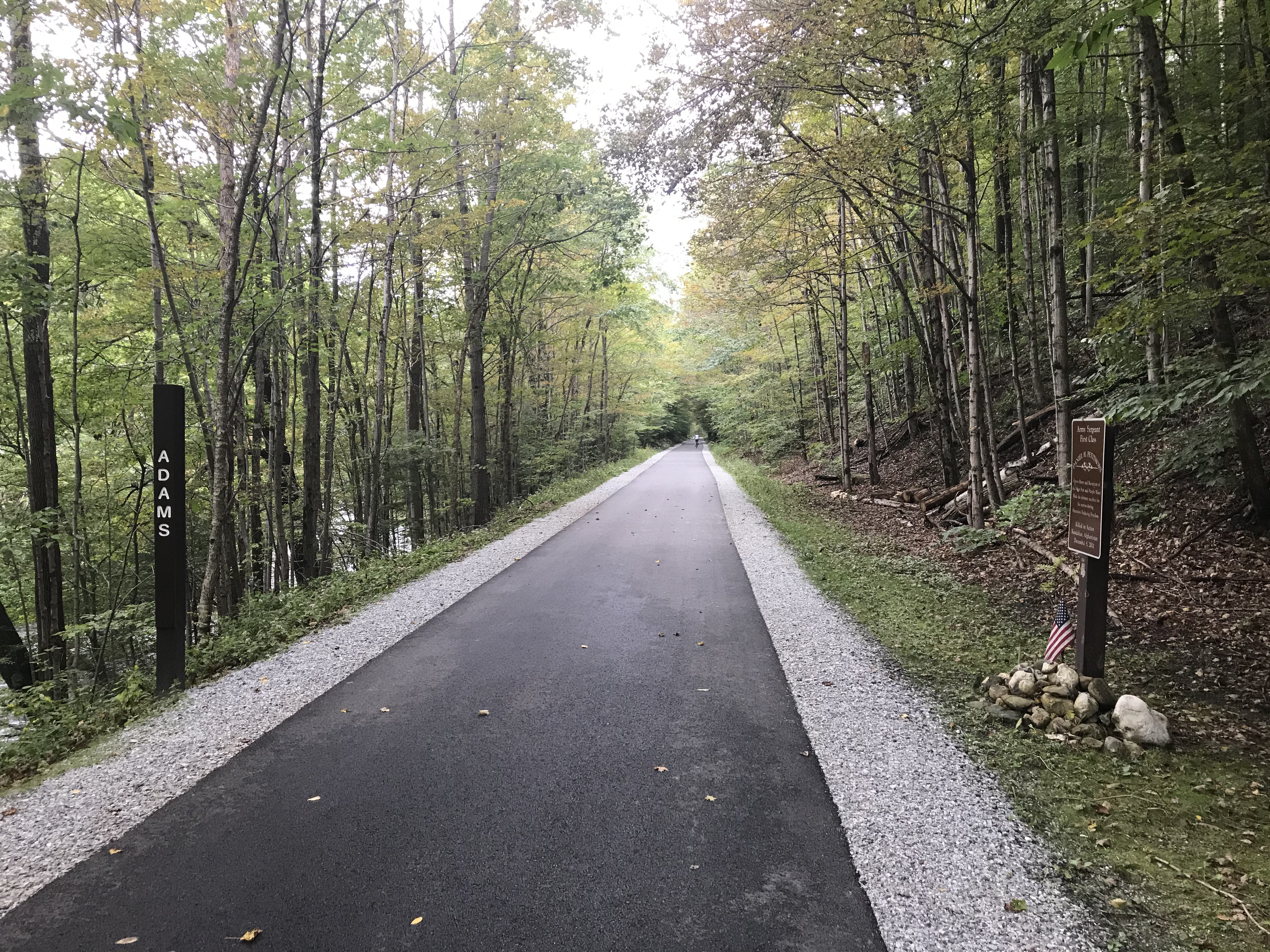
- The Ashuwillticook Rail Trail in Adams in 2021
- Length: 14.05 miles (22.61 km)
- Location: Berkshire County, Massachusetts
- Established: 2001
- Designation: Massachusetts state park
- Trailheads: Adams (42.63955°N 73.11105°W); Pittsfield (42.46237°N 73.20755°W)
- Use: Hiking, biking
- Difficulty: Easy
- Sights: Berkshire Pond, Cheshire Reservoir, Hoosic River, Mount Greylock
- Surface: Paved
- Maintained by: Department of Conservation and Recreation
- Website: Ashuwillticook Rail Trail

The Ashuwillticook Rail Trail is a 14.05-mile (22.61 km) rail trail that runs north-south through the towns of Cheshire, Lanesborough and Adams, and into the city of Pittsfield, Massachusetts. It is a multi-use trail for biking, walking, roller-blading, and jogging. The trail is managed by the Massachusetts Department of Conservation and Recreation (DCR). It was built on the former Pittsfield and North Adams Railroad.

The Ashuwillticook Rail Trail passes through the Hoosac River Valley, between Mount Greylock and the Hoosac Mountains. Cheshire Reservoir, the Hoosic River, and associated wetland communities flank much of the trail. The word Ashuwillticook is from the American Indian name for the south branch of the Hoosic River and literally means "at the in-between pleasant river," or in common tongue, "the pleasant river in between the hills."

== History ==
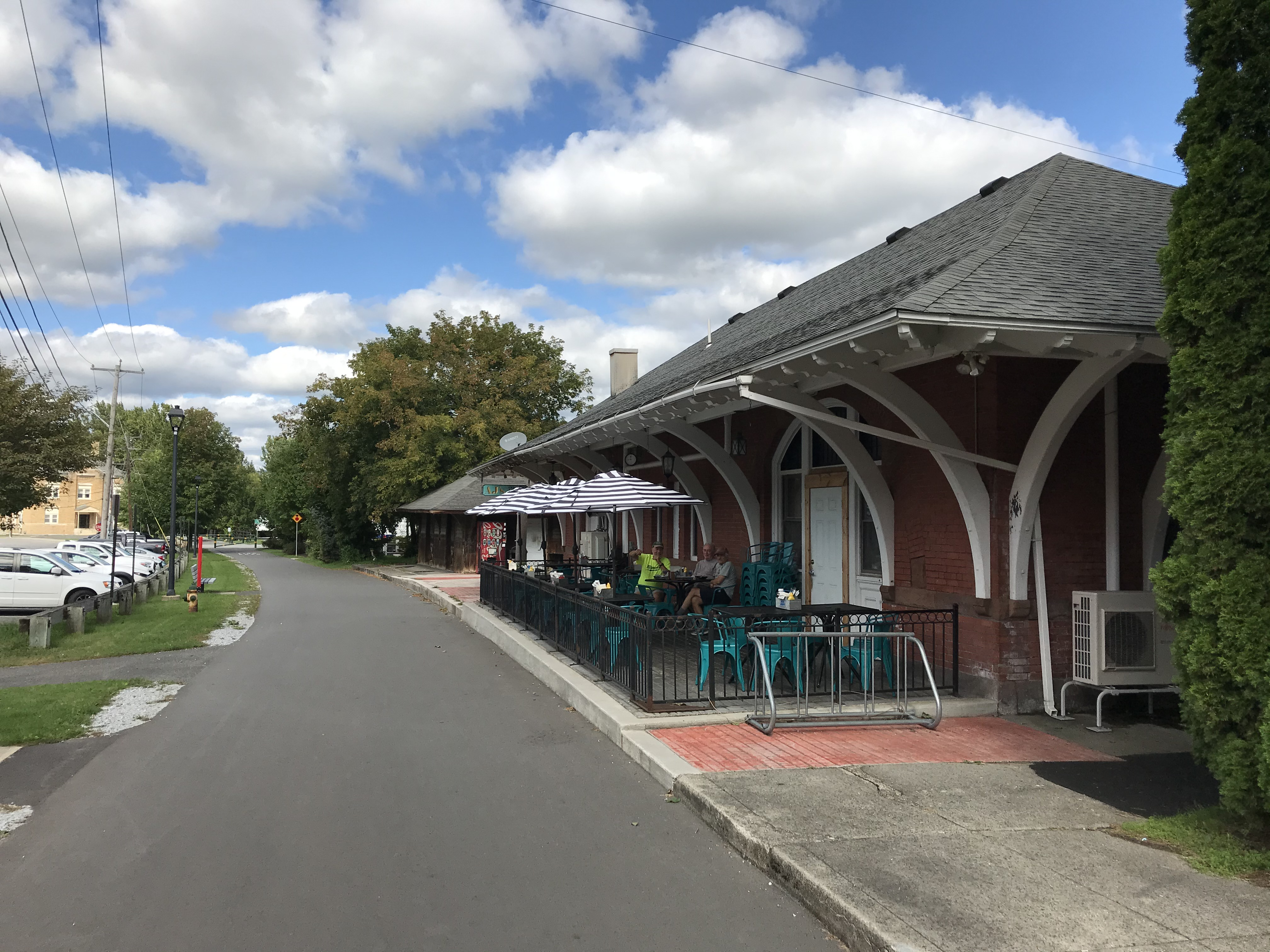
The trail next to the former Adams station

In 1845, the Pittsfield and North Adams Railroad developed this corridor with the goal of extending the Housatonic Railroad north to Rutland, Vermont. While the track was under construction, the company was acquired by the Western Railroad, which later became part of the Boston and Albany Railroad (B&A), as their North Adams Branch. Mineral traffic developed on the line and a number of limestone operations went into business. The New York Central Railroad took over the B&A in 1900, and upgraded the line, which was sold to the Boston and Maine Corporation (B&M) in 1981. As a connection to an existing track in North Adams, the B&M operated the line until 1990.

The first two phases of the trail opened in 2001 and 2004, with a 1.2-mile (1.9 km) northerly extension added in 2017. A 1.5 miles (2.4 km) extension south to Crane Avenue in Pittsfield opened in the spring of 2022. Another 0.5-mile (0.8 km) segment south to Merrill Road opened in 2024 at a cost of $2.3 million.

The state intends to extend the trail north and west to Williamstown for a total length of 25 miles (40 km), with additional potential extension south to the Housatonic village of Great Barrington. These extensions are expected to have higher costs than the existing path, which already covers the full disused length of the rail line. A 2.4-mile (3.9 km) northern extension to Hodges Cross Road in North Adams is planned to begin construction in 2028. In January 2025, the Berkshire Regional Planning Commission was awarded a $17.3 million federal grant to fund design of the remaining 9.3 miles (15.0 km) to Williamstown.
