= Cheshire Mammoth Cheese =

Giant cheese sent to Thomas Jefferson in 1802

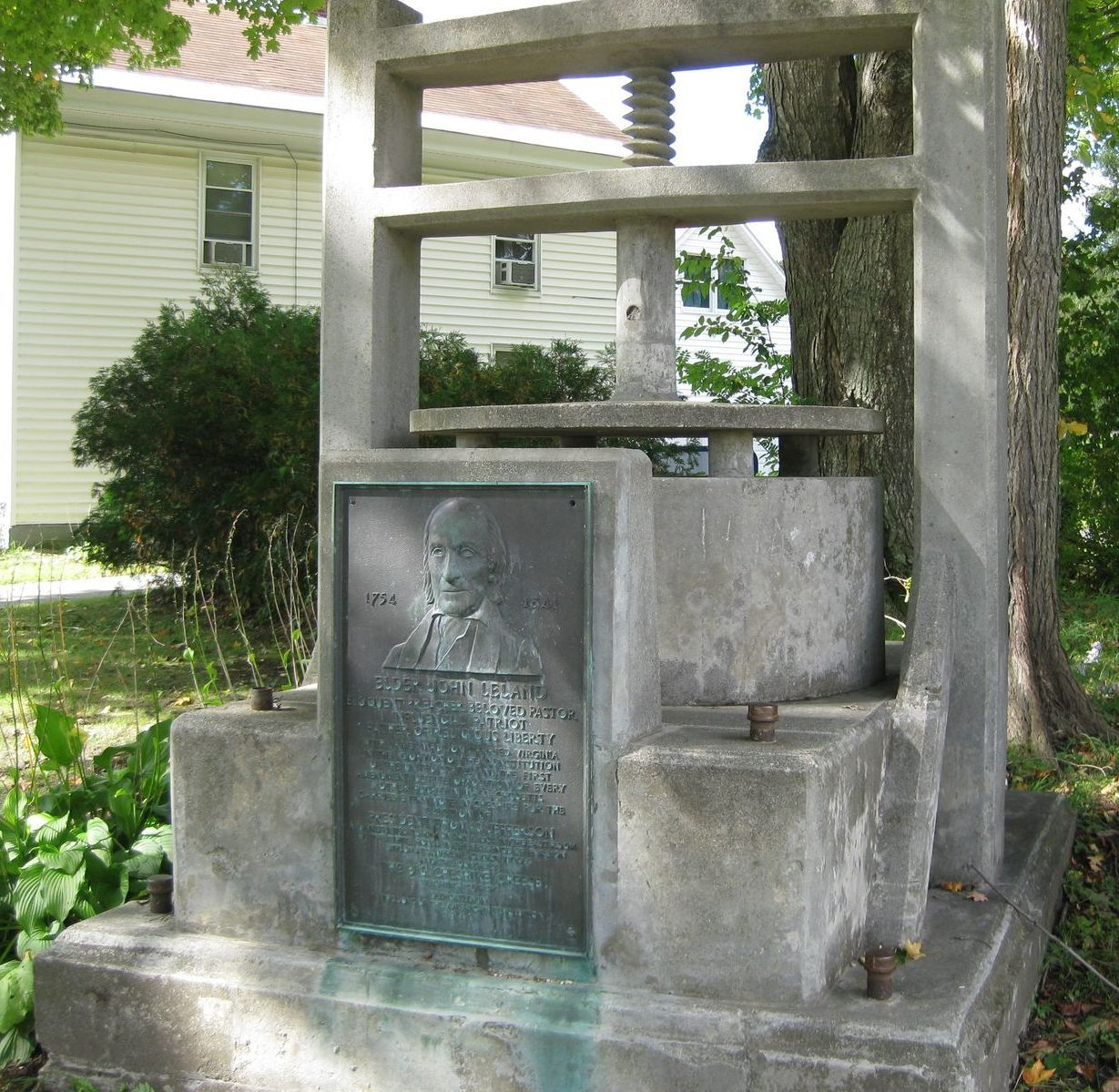
The Cheshire Cheese Press monument, which commemorates the production and presentation of the Mammoth Cheese

The Cheshire Mammoth Cheese was a gift cheese wheel from the town of Cheshire, Massachusetts to President Thomas Jefferson in 1802. The 1,235-pound (560 kg) cheese was created by combining the milk of every cow in the town, and pressed in a makeshift cheese press to handle the cheese's size. The cheese bore the Jeffersonian motto "Rebellion to tyrants is obedience to God."

== History ==
The town of Cheshire, Massachusetts was incorporated in 1793 from parts of Adams, New Ashford, Lanesborough, and Windsor. The original settlers came from Rhode Island and created New Providence Plantation on Providence Hill, later renamed to Stafford Hill in honor of Colonel Joab Stafford, who had originally surveyed the area in 1767 and later led local revolutionary soldiers against the British in the 1777 Battle of Bennington.

Given the political landscape of the time, there was a fear that the more Republican Jefferson, considered by some an "infidel of the French Revolutionary school," would harm the religious interests of the citizenry, and that "the altars of New England would be demolished, and all their religious institutions would be swept away by an inrushing and irresistible flood of French infidelity."

One pastor in Cheshire, Elder John Leland, opposed this line of thought. A beleaguered minority in Congregationalist New England, the Baptists were perhaps the strongest advocates in the early republic of the separation of church and state. Leland had met Jefferson during the former's time in Virginia and the two had grown to have a friendly relationship. Leland remembered this as he served in Cheshire and campaigned strongly for Jefferson.

== Making the cheese ==
John Leland, believing that his efforts had helped Thomas Jefferson win the presidency, encouraged his townspeople to make a unique gesture to Jefferson. He urged each member of his congregation "who owned a cow to bring every quart of milk given on a given day, or all the curd it would make, to a great cider mill..." He also insisted that "no Federal cow" (cow owned by a Federalist farmer) be allowed to offer any milk, "lest it should leaven the whole lump with a distasteful savour." The cheese itself was produced solely by the labor of freeborn farmers of Berkshire County, Massachusetts. As stated in a letter from Leland to Jefferson, the cheese was made "without the assistance of a single slave."

The townspeople brought their milk (according to Dumas Malone's biography on Jefferson, the cheese was made from the milk of 900 cows) and curd to a cider mill where a large hoop was placed on a cider press, resulting in a massive cheese press. The townspeople added their ingredients, sang a hymn over the press, and, after a time, the cheese was ready. As more ingredients than were necessary had been presented, three smaller cheeses were created, but Leland dedicated the largest cheese to Jefferson, calling the cheese "the greatest cheese ever put to press in the New World or Old."

The final product weighed 1,235 pounds (560 kg) and was 4 feet (1.2 m) wide and 15 inches (380 mm) thick. Due to its size, it could not safely be transported on wheels, so the town hired a sleigh to bring it to a barge on the Hudson River for the start of its trip to Washington, D.C. After floating down the Hudson to New York City, the cheese was loaded onto the sloop Astrea and taken to Baltimore, Maryland, where it was loaded onto a horse-drawn wagon for the final trip to Washington. The cheese's three-week, 500-mile (800 km) journey from Cheshire to Washington became an event from town to town as word spread about the gift.

== Delivery to the White House ==
The cheese was eventually presented to President Thomas Jefferson on January 1, 1802. John Leland considered the cheese an act of "profound respect...to the popular ratification of his election." While the cheese did serve to praise Jefferson, the town also made a political statement in its letter to Jefferson, noting that "the cheese was procured by the personal labor of freeborn farmers with the voluntary and cheerful aid of their wives and daughters, without the assistance of a single slave." Although the gift would draw criticisms of Jefferson and the people of Cheshire, Jefferson praised the act as "extraordinary proof of the skill with which those domestic arts...are practiced by [the citizens of Cheshire]." The President then cut a piece of the cheese to present to the town, and it was widely considered the greatest cheese presented at the White House. Jefferson, who opposed the gift-giving custom on principle, gave a $200 donation (over 50% of the actual market price) to Leland's congregation as a gesture of gratitude.

The cheese remained at the White House for over two years, being featured in a public dinner for an Independence Day celebration in 1803. It was eventually replaced by the "Mammoth Loaf," a large loaf of bread made by the United States Navy out of a barrel full of flour.

== Legacy ==
President Andrew Jackson's supporters commissioned a similar cheese for consumption in 1837, as his supporters believed that "every honor which Jefferson had ever received should be paid him." This event later became the inspiration for a recurring event on the White House television drama The West Wing, called "Big Block of Cheese Day." The cheese inspired a critically acclaimed work of fiction, The Mammoth Cheese, by Sheri Holman in 2004, which told the story of a small town cheesemaker convinced by her pastor to make a giant cheese for the President-elect. The cheese also became the subject of a children's picture book, A Big Cheese for the White House, by Candace Fleming, and was a subject of an episode of the American history comedy podcast The Dollop. Today, a cast concrete cheese press stands in Cheshire, with a plaque dedicated to John Leland affixed to it.
