= Joseph Scelsi Intermodal Transportation Center =

Transit facility in Massachusetts, US

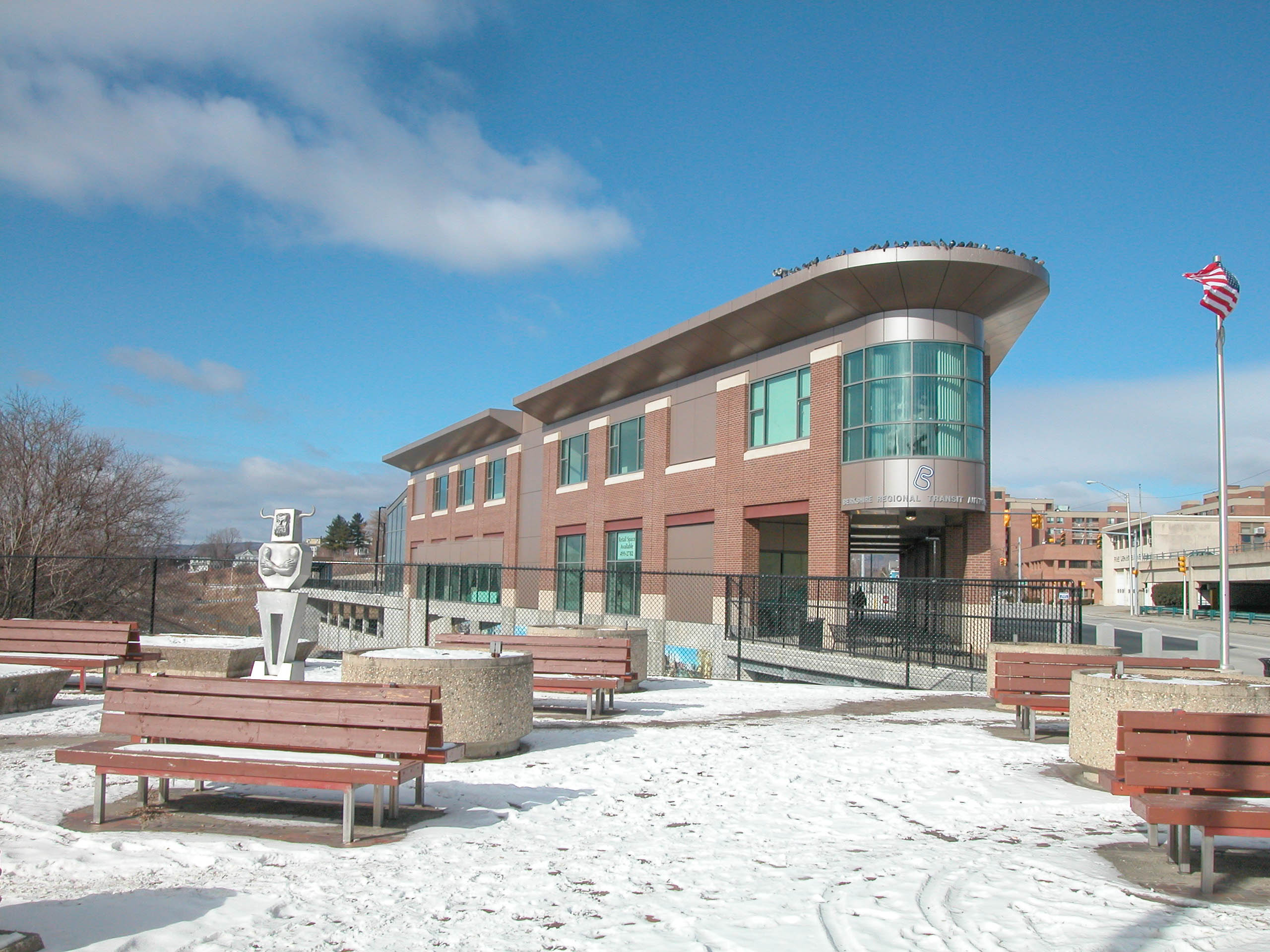
- Front of Pittsfield station in March 2006

General information
- Location: 1 Columbus Avenue at North Street; Pittsfield, Massachusetts; United States
- Coordinates: 42.4515°N 73.2540°W
- Owner: BRTA (building); City of Pittsfield (parking lot); CSX (track and platform)
- Line: Berkshire Subdivision
- Platforms: 1 side platform
- Tracks: 2
- Connections: BRTA: 1, 2, 4, 5A, 5B, 11, 12, 14, 15, 921; Link 413: 901, 904; Peter Pan Bus

Construction
- Parking: Yes
- Accessible: Yes

Other information
- Station code: Amtrak: PIT

History
- Opened: 1841 (Western Railroad station); 1850 (Housatonic Railroad station)
- Closed: May 1, 1971 – October 28, 1975
- Rebuilt: 1854 (replacement Western Railroad station); 1866 (first Union Station); August 23, 1914 (second Union Station); 1965 (NYC station); April 26, 1981 (Amtrak station); November 22, 2004 (current)

Passengers
- FY 2025: 9,197 annually (Amtrak)

Services
Preceding station	Amtrak	Following station
Albany–Rensselaer toward New York	Berkshire Flyer	Terminus
Albany–Rensselaer toward Chicago	Lake Shore Limited	Springfield toward Boston South
Former services
Preceding station	New York Central Railroad	Following station
Chatham toward Albany	Boston and Albany Railroad Main Line	Springfield, MA toward Boston
Richmond Summit toward Albany	Boston and Albany Railroad Main Line	Dalton toward Boston
Terminus	North Adams Branch	Coltsville toward North Adams
Preceding station	New York, New Haven and Hartford Railroad	Following station
Lenox toward Norwalk and South Norwalk	Pittsfield Branch	Terminus
Location

The Joseph Scelsi Intermodal Transportation Center (often referred to as the ITC or the Scelsi ITC) is a transit facility located in downtown Pittsfield, Massachusetts, United States. The $11 million facility is named after Joseph Scelsi, a longtime State Representative who represented Pittsfield. Owned by the Berkshire Regional Transit Authority (BRTA), it is serviced by local BRTA bus services, Amtrak intercity rail service, and Peter Pan intercity bus service. The second floor of the building houses two classrooms used by Berkshire Community College and Massachusetts College of Liberal Arts.

Railroad stations have been located in downtown Pittsfield since the Western Railroad opened in 1841. The original station burned in 1854; after its replacement proved inadequate, a union station was constructed in 1866 to serve the Western plus the Housatonic Railroad and the Pittsfield and North Adams Railroad. A second, larger union station replaced it in 1914. The New Haven Railroad and New York Central Railroad moved to smaller depots in 1960 and 1965, and Union Station was demolished in 1968. Rail service to Pittsfield ended in 1971 but returned in 1975 and moved to a new shelter downtown in 1981. The ITC opened in 2004 to combine local and intercity bus and intercity rail operations into one location.

== Services ==
=== Berkshire Regional Transit Authority ===
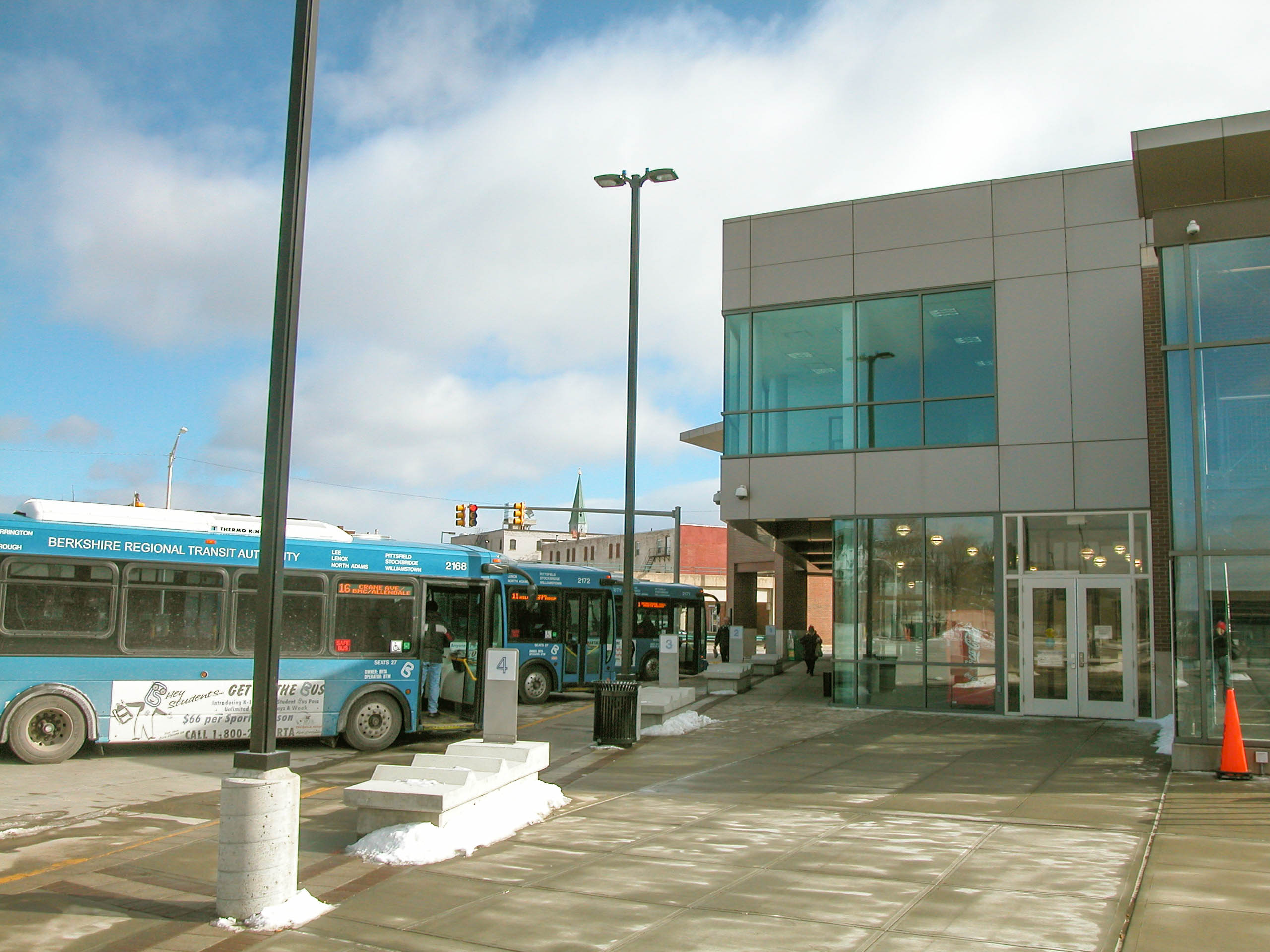
BRTA buses at Scelsi ITC in 2006

The Scelsi ITC serves as a hub and a transfer point for most of the BRTA's routes, though travel to Williamstown sometimes requires a transfer in North Adams, Massachusetts and travel to West Stockbridge and Great Barrington sometimes requires a transfer in Lee. Twelve BRTA routes run from the ITC.

=== Amtrak ===
The Boston section of Amtrak's Lake Shore Limited serves Pittsfield with one train in each direction daily. Both trains are scheduled to arrive mid-afternoon. The Berkshire Flyer provides summer weekend service to New York Penn Station via the Empire Corridor. The Flyer makes one round trip each on Fridays and Sundays. The Amtrak platform, which is located below the main level of the building, is accessible using a stairway or an elevator. There is a single low-level platform facing one of the line's two tracks. A wheelchair lift is available for use if needed, making the station accessible.

=== Intercity bus ===
Peter Pan Bus Lines serves Pittsfield with two daily round trips on its Albany-Springfield-Providence route. Peter Pan's Bonanza Bus division serves Pittsfield with two daily round trips on its New York-Danbury-Williamstown route. The station is also served by Link 413 routes 901 and 904.

== History ==
=== Early stations ===
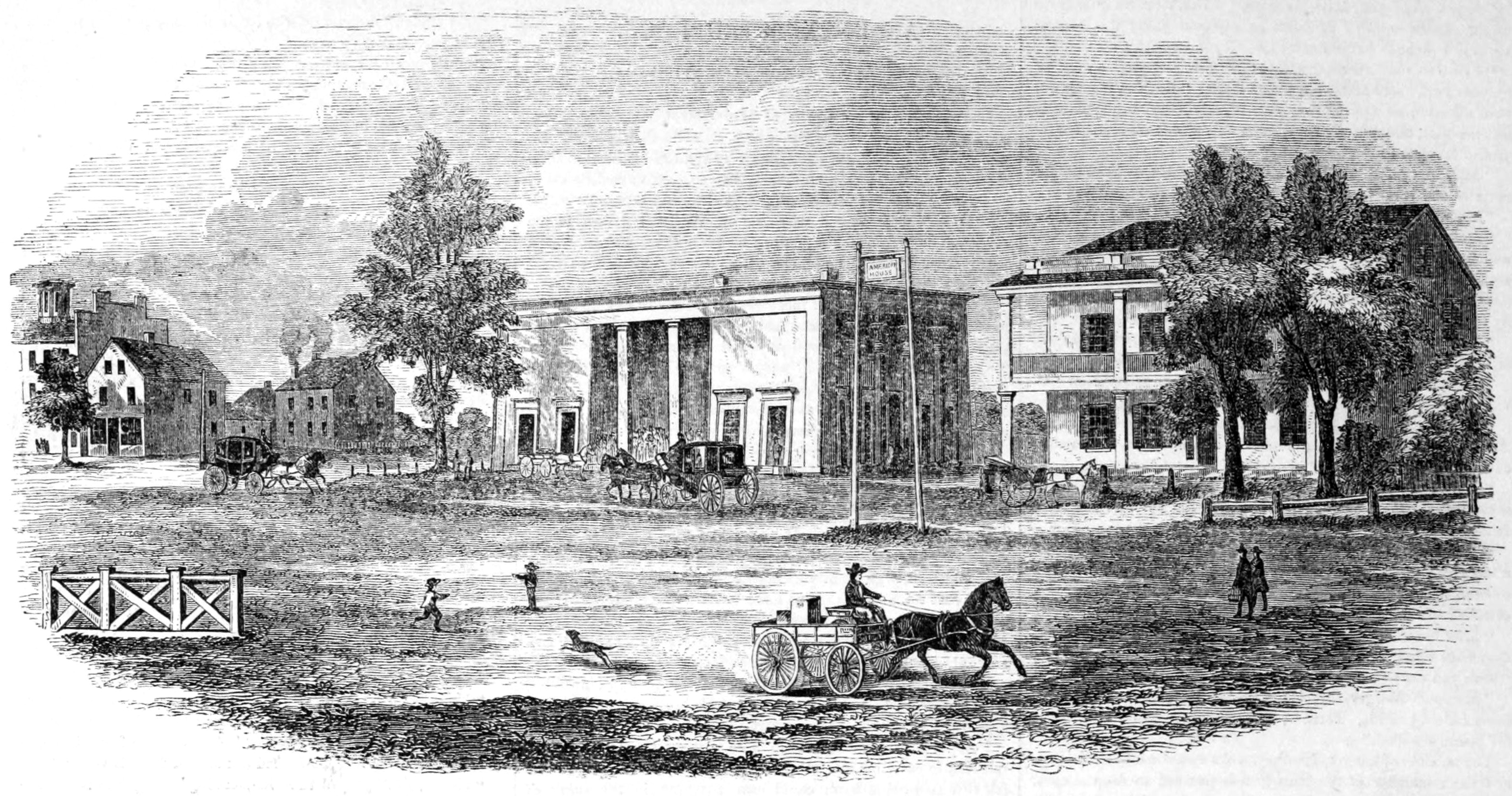
The oft-maligned 1840-built station around 1842

The Western Railroad opened from the New York – Massachusetts state line to Pittsfield, Massachusetts on July 4, 1841; the first train from the state line to Springfield ran on October 4, 1841. A wooden station had been built the previous year at West Street in Pittsfield. Its design, a "wooden imitation of Egyptian architecture" with Greek columns in antis, was an example of the architecture of railroads combining familiar forms with the unfamiliar technology, a juxtaposition common in Europe. Passengers boarded from a dank lower level, and the station was vastly unpopular.

The Pittsfield and North Adams Railroad opened to the north on October 6, 1846; it was owned and operated by the Western and shared its depot. The Stockbridge and Pittsfield Railroad opened to the south in January 1850 and was immediately merged into the Housatonic Railroad; it used a depot near West Street around 0.5 miles (0.80 km) away from the Western Railroad station. With the completion of the Housatonic, passengers could travel in four directions from Pittsfield: west to Albany, north to North Adams, east to Springfield and Boston, and south to Bridgeport and New York City.

Like many wooden stations of the era, the 1840 depot did not last long; it burned in half an hour at noon on November 5, 1854. An 1876 history of the city reported that:

The flames presented a beautiful spectacle, as they swept through its large, hollow, wooden columns, and no regret for the loss of the building checked the enjoyment of the scene. It was never so much admired as during the last half-hour of its existence.

The Western soon replaced it with a more conventional one-story wooden station slightly to the west. Although well-liked, it proved too small within a decade.

=== The first Union Station ===
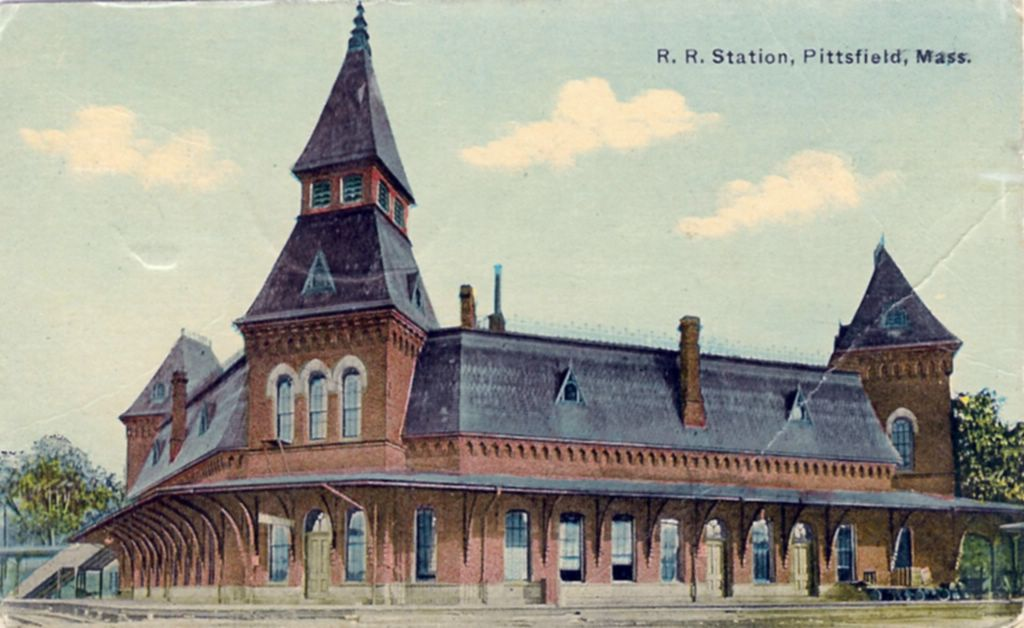
The first Union Station in the early 1900s

By the mid-1860s, the crowded conditions at the Western Railroad station, and its location 0.5 miles (0.80 km) away from the Housatonic station (a headache for transferring passengers) led to calls for a union station to be built. Although initially mutually antagonistic, the two railroads ultimately agreed for their common good. On April 7, 1866, the Massachusetts General Court passed a law authorizing the construction of a union station at West Street facing Park Square. Berkshire County was authorized to build a bypass of West Street under the tracks to eliminate the level crossing and provide room for the depot. The station was to be owned by the Western Railroad but shared equally by both.

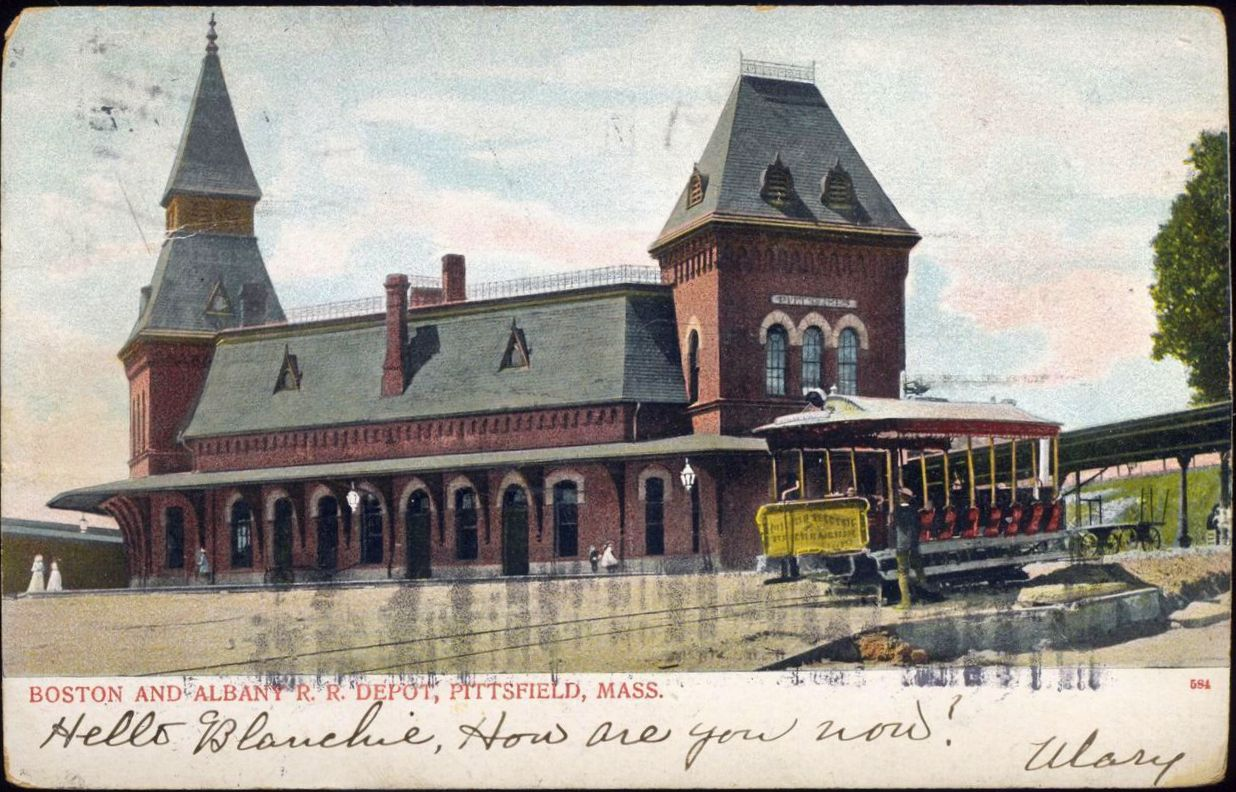
The first Union Station with a Pittsfield Electric trolley in 1906

The new 7,456-square-foot (692.7 m^{2}) Union Station, described as "one of the most convenient and beautiful depots in the country" was quickly constructed and opened by the end of the year. The brick structure occupied an obtuse triangular footprint with the long side facing the tracks. All three corners featured a tower, with the front corner the highest. A pedestrian bridge over the tracks connected the station with neighborhoods off West Street and Francis Avenue to the west. The Pittsfield Street Railway opened in 1886 and was electrified in 1891 as the Pittsfield Electric Street Railway; the Pittsfield Electric and its successor the Berkshire Street Railway operated a spur on West Street to bring streetcars directly to the station.

After years of feuding, the Western Railroad joined with the Boston and Worcester Railroad in 1867 to become the Boston and Albany Railroad (B&A). The Housatonic Railroad was acquired by the New York, New Haven and Hartford Railroad (NYNH&H) as its Berkshire Division in 1892, with most service thus running from Danbury rather than Bridgeport. In 1900, the New York Central Railroad (NYC) leased the B&A, though the latter retained its independent identity for decades after. The B&A operated a rail yard and roundhouse just north of Union Station.

=== The second Union Station ===
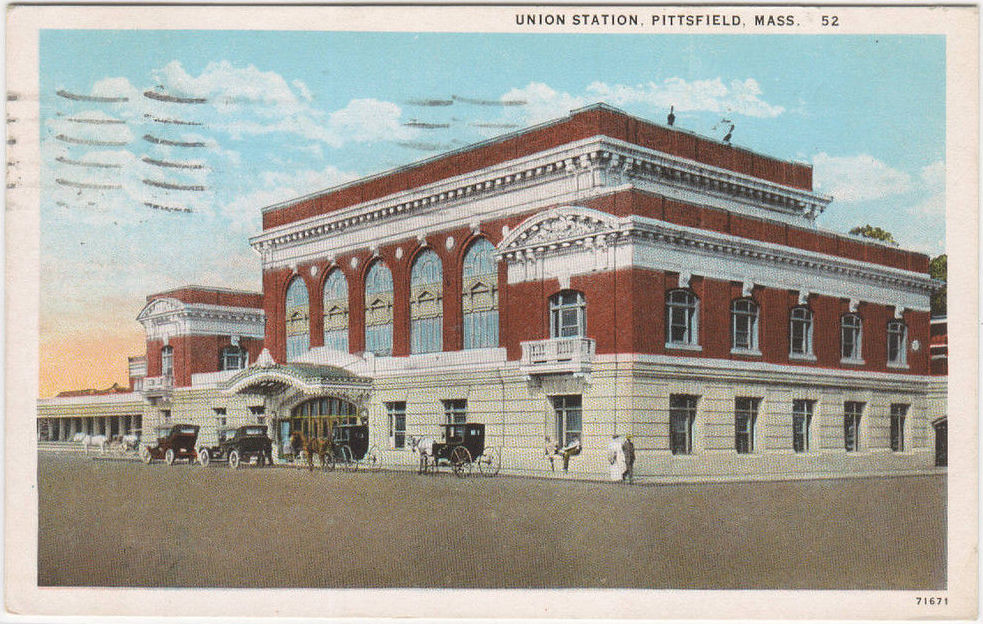
A 1928 postcard of the 1914 Union Station

Four decades after its construction, Union Station was proving too small for its role as the principal railroad hub of Berkshire County. In 1908 local residents began agitating for a larger station, and William H. MacInnis made it a platform of his mayoral candidacy. In 1910 MacInnis appointed a three-man committee (one a director of the B&A) to lobby the railroad authorities to replace Union Station. Financial constraints at first hampered their efforts. but in April 1912 the B&A agreed to support the project. In 1913, the NYNH&H acquired the former Burbank Hotel property and began constructing the second Union Station. The new station opened on August 24, 1914.

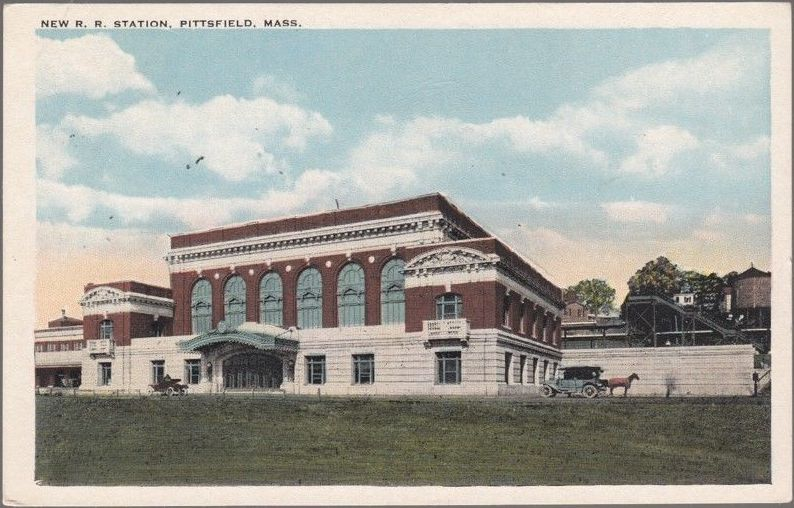
Postcard view of the second Union Station, showing the pedestrian bridge and water tower at right

The new Union Station cost $400,000 all told, with construction of the station itself costing $300,000. Constructed in the Beaux Arts style of red brick with white terra cotta trim, the station was more than twice its predecessor's size at 17,953 square feet (1,667.9 m^{2}). A high terrazzo ceiling contained skylights to supplement the high arched windows. The walls were green marble for the dado and "white, green-veined Vermont marble" above; furnishings were polished wood, and the city's seal was reproduced in mosaic on the floor. Modern conveniences included all-electric chandeliers, thermostat-controlled heat, an intercom for announcing trains, and a restaurant inside the station building.

At its peak in 1912, the B&A operated 12 Boston-Albany round trips, one Boston-Pittsfield round trip, and as many as 10 Pittsfield-North Adams round trips. Around 1913 the New Haven planned to use the Housatonic as part of a New York-Montreal through route to compete with the NYC, but this never materialized and service levels were never high. After 1926 New Haven operated two daily New York-Pittsfield round trips with additional weekend service plus a Great Barrington-Pittsfield commuter trip operated by a railbus. Until 1934 the NYC operated the Berkshire Hills Express between North Adams and New York City via Pittsfield. Afterwards, the company continued unnamed continuous trains over the same route. After 1935, nonstop New York-Pittsfield weekend trips were added for skiers during the winter.

=== Decline ===
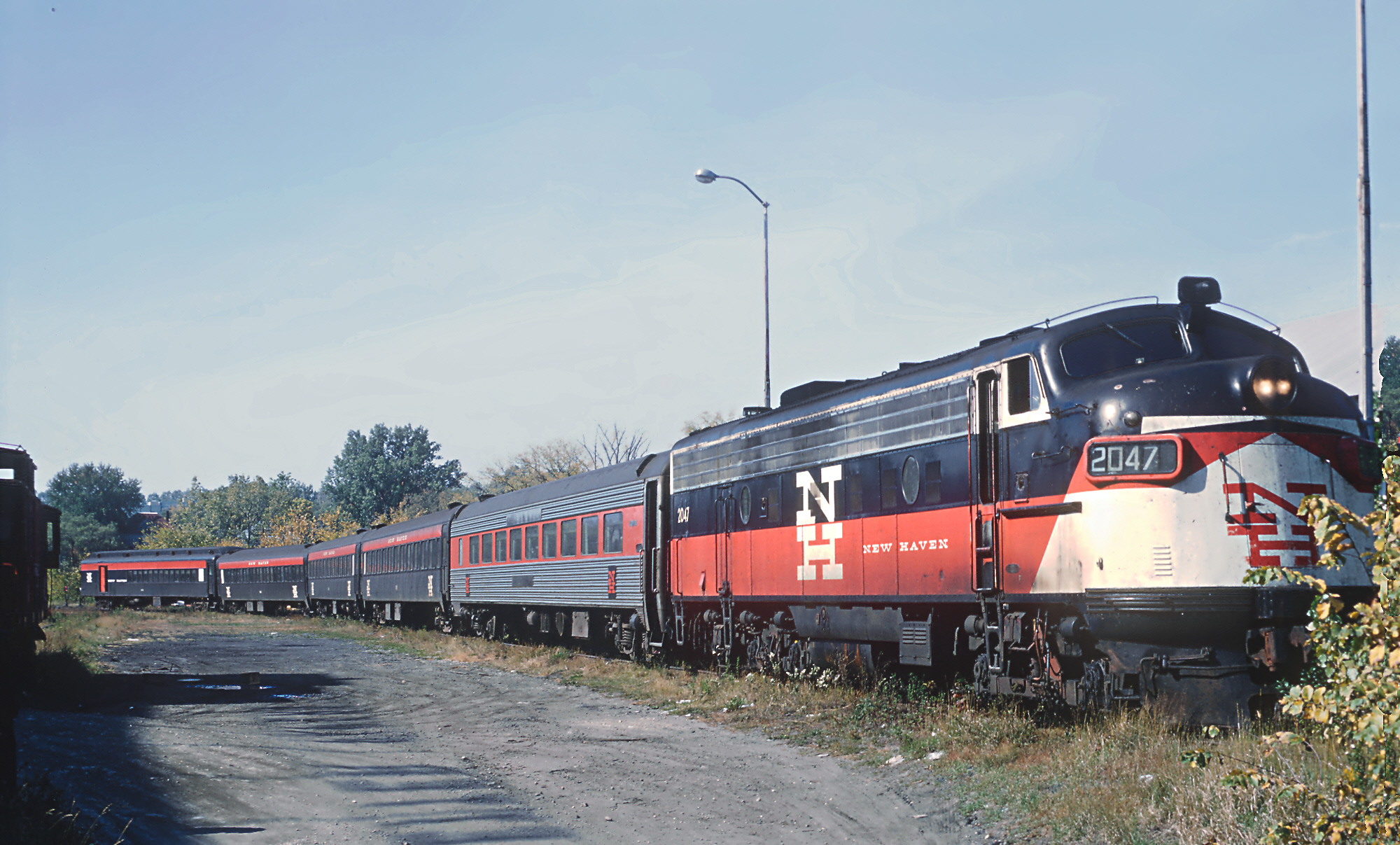
One of the weekend-only Berkshire Division trains at Pittsfield in 1968, shortly before Penn Central reduced the trains to Budd RDCs

Berkshire Division service began to decline before World War II, when increased automobile availability reduced the appeal of travel by train. The line had always used the oldest equipment on the railroad, and all trains except one weekly round trip lost their parlor cars in 1940 and 1942. In January 1960, profitable railway post office service was ended due to unsuitable schedules, and starting in March 1960 all trains except two weekend through round trips were run by single Budd RDCs and truncated to Danbury where passengers could change for local trains to New York. In November 1960, the New Haven moved its station passenger services, including the Berkshire and the Litchfield from Union Station to a converted freight house slightly to the east to save money, leaving the B&A alone in the station. In March 1964, the Interstate Commerce Commission authorized the NYNH&H to cut all Berkshire Division services except the weekend trips.

B&A service was also cut due to financial problems in the late 1930s and again after World War II; by 1950, Pittsfield was served by eight Boston-Albany round trips per day. The two daily trips to North Adams (which ran as shuttles from the Harlem Line at Chatham or the Water Level Route at Albany in their final years) ended in 1953. The opening of the Massachusetts Turnpike in 1957 and the Berkshire Thruway two years later provided for the first time an auto route to western Massachusetts superior to the narrow and winding Route 20; this effectively decimated long-distance service on the B&A. In January 1960 the NYC received permission to discontinue all B&A service that April, but public outcry prevented full cancellation. On April 24, 1960, stops west of Framingham except Worcester, Palmer, Springfield, and Pittsfield were closed; Boston-Albany service via Pittsfield was reduced to just 3.5 daily round trips. Still facing losses, the B&A was finally fully absorbed into the NYC in 1961, effectively subsidized by its popular New York commuter service. The crack New England States, introduced in 1938, was combined with the 20th Century Limited west of Buffalo on November 5, 1967. After the latter was discontinued on December 2, the New England States lost its named distinction on December 3.

In 1956, the NYC attempted to sell Union Station to the city for use as a city hall, in order to downsize into a less expensive station. The public was indifferent to the proposal, but the city refused because decades of deferred maintenance (caused by neglecting stations in order to have the funds to run federally-required trains) had left the station in extremely poor condition. In 1965, over the objections of city councilman (and later state representative) Joseph Scelsi, the city council allowed the NYC to build a much smaller wooden station 2 miles (3.2 km) east of downtown near the large manufacturing plants of General Electric and other companies. Although preservation attempts were made in 1966, the Union Station building was too deteriorated to save, and it was demolished for urban renewal efforts in 1968. Some fragments of the station may have been saved.

The NYC merged into Penn Central Railroad on February 1, 1968, followed by the New Haven on December 31. Penn Central continued to run the twice-weekly Berkshire Division train and the daily Boston-Albany train (the former, nameless New England States) through Pittsfield until April 30, 1971. On May 1, 1971, Amtrak took over most passenger service in the United States. Service between Worcester and Albany along the Boston and Albany Railroad route, as well as all service on the Housatonic, was discontinued, leaving Pittsfield with no passenger rail service for the first time in 130 years.

=== Return of passenger service ===
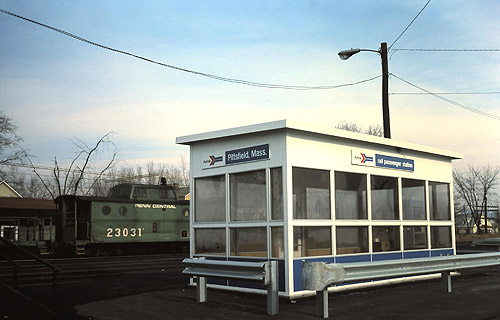
The station shelter at Pittsfield in December 1975, shortly after the Lake Shore Limited began serving the station

Two weeks after taking over service, Amtrak added the Boston-New Haven Bay State, which restored service on the B&A as far west as Springfield. Never successful, it was ended on March 1, 1975. The MBTA began subsidizing Penn Central commuter rail service between Boston and Framingham – but not the lone commuter trip to Worcester – in January 1973. Penn Central discontinued the Worcester trip on October 27, 1975; in response, Amtrak revived the dormant New York-Chicago Lake Shore Limited on October 31, with a new section running Boston-Albany and thus restoring service to Pittsfield. The Lake Shore Limited stopped at the east-of-downtown station that had been used from 1965 to 1971.

An Amshack (a small aluminum and Plexiglas bus shelter) with a bare asphalt platform was built in downtown Pittsfield near the former Union Station. The 'station' opened on April 26, 1981. The 1965-built station was converted to a yard office, used by Conrail and later CSX Transportation for their adjacent Pittsfield Yard.

=== Scelsi Intermodal Transportation Center ===
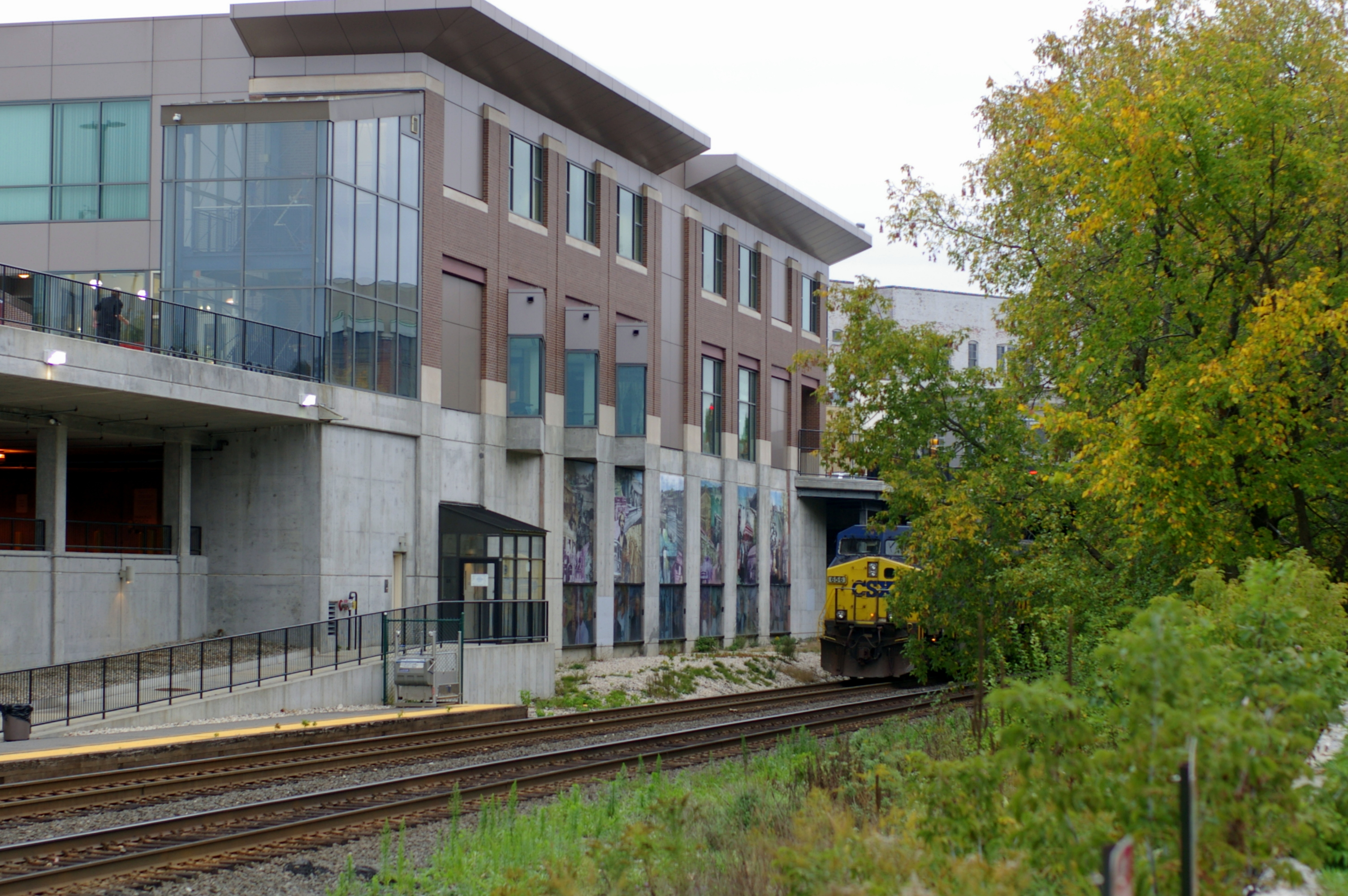
A CSX freight train passes the platform at Scelsi ITC

In the late 1980s, local officials began to consider constructing a new station to serve both Amtrak trains and the Berkshire Regional Transit Authority, which had taken over private bus services in the area in 1974. Between 1993 and 1999, BRTA administrator Diane Smith worked to advance plans for an intermodal transit center. A study completed in January 1998 provided cost-benefit analysis and preliminary costs and recommended eight sites for further study. Based on this, Congressman John W. Olver obtained $8.615 million in federal earmarks to fund the project; the state provided the 20% local match to reach the full $11 million cost.

The Wallace Floyd Design Group was responsible for the station's architecture. Groundbreaking was held in August 2002; completion was originally scheduled within a year but delayed due to an unusually cold winter and the primary steel supplier going bankrupt. The station officially opened on November 22, 2004. Olver and Senator Edward Kennedy placed bricks from the 1914 Union Station into the columns of the new station. The building was named after Joseph Scelsi for his activism regarding Union Station.

The Scelsi ITC houses BRTA offices, a waiting room, concession vendors, and other office tenants. The second floor of the building houses two classrooms used by Berkshire Community College and Massachusetts College of Liberal Arts. On May 19, 2013, the Pittsfield Visitor Center moved into the first floor of the ITC, to be staffed by local volunteers.

In May 2018, the Massachusetts Senate approved funds for a pilot of the Berkshire Flyer, a seasonal extension of one weekend Amtrak Empire Service round trip to Pittsfield. The trial service, modeled on the CapeFLYER, was originally scheduled to begin in June 2020. Initial service consisted of one Friday afternoon train to Pittsfield and a return trip on Sunday afternoon, though an additional northbound train was added for the 2024 season, and an additional southbound trip was added in 2026. After delays due to the COVID-19 pandemic in the United States, the pilot was rescheduled for summer 2022 and 2023. The first trip departed July 8, 2022.

Pittsfield is a proposed stop on East-West Rail, which would provide intercity passenger service between Boston and Albany, via Pittsfield.
