= Cheshire, Massachusetts =

- Town
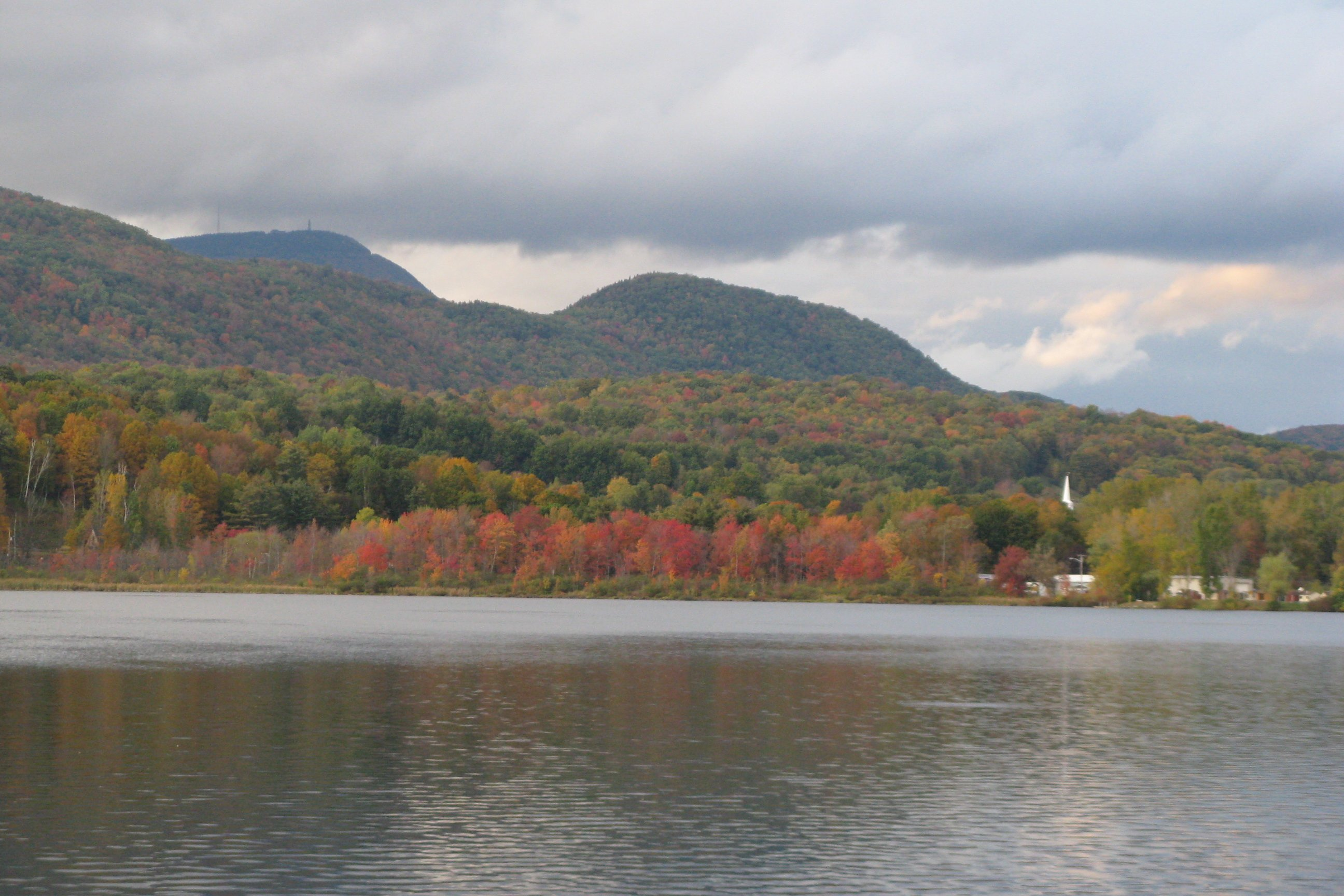
- Cheshire Reservoir

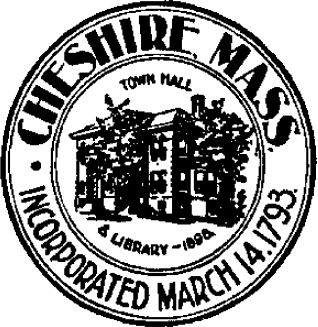
- Seal

- Location in Berkshire County and the state of Massachusetts.
- Coordinates: 42°33′43″N 73°09′48″W
- Country: United States
- State: Massachusetts
- County: Berkshire
- Settled: 1766
- Incorporated: 1793

Government
  - Type: Open town meeting

Area
  - Total: 27.5 sq mi (71.3 km^{2})
  - Land: 26.8 sq mi (69.4 km^{2})
  - Water: 0.69 sq mi (1.8 km^{2})
- Elevation: 965 ft (294 m)

Population (2020)
  - Total: 3,258
  - Density: 122/sq mi (46.9/km^{2})
- Time zone: UTC−5 (Eastern)
  - Summer (DST): UTC−4 (Eastern)
- ZIP Code: 01225
- Area code: 413
- FIPS code: 25-13345
- GNIS feature ID: 0618264
- Website: cheshire-ma.gov

Cheshire is a town in Berkshire County, Massachusetts, United States. It is part of the Pittsfield, Massachusetts Metropolitan Statistical Area. The population was 3,258 at the 2020 census. It contains the census-designated place of the same name.

== History ==
Cheshire was first settled in 1766 and officially incorporated in 1793. It was named after Cheshire in England.

The valley town was founded by Baptists from Rhode Island, the first settlers in the region who were not of the established Puritan Church. The early colonists were mostly descendants of those who had followed Roger Williams to Rhode Island to practice freely. One of the emigration's leaders was Colonel Joab Stafford, who built his house on Stafford Hill and led the men of Cheshire into war during the Revolution.

Cheshire was incorporated in 1793, and its residents were strongly partisan in the election battles of the country's early days. The Adams–Jefferson election of 1800 was hard fought, and Cheshire was the only Berkshire town that favored Jefferson. When their candidate won the election, the town searched for a way to show their support and pay a tribute to their new president. Because Cheshire, like their namesake, specialized in dairying and making cheese, they decided to send a unique gift to the president: a Cheshire cheese that used curds from every farmer in town. The resulting cheese was 4 feet (1.2 m) in diameter, 18 inches (460 mm) thick and weighed 1,235 pounds (560 kg). It was moved on a sled drawn by six horses when it was shipped off to Washington, D.C. by water, where it drew a personal letter of thanks from President Jefferson. One of the two monuments in Cheshire commemorates the cheese; the other memorializes the founders of the town. The Pioneer Monument is on Stafford Hill and is a fieldstone replica of Benedict Arnold's Norse Mill in Newport, Rhode Island.

The town had early forges and saw mills, grist mills and tanneries, and in 1812, the Cheshire Crown Glass Company opened, as did a triphammer operation.

Cheshire Glass Manufacturing company: Was in business at least in June 1900. The only records to show this are shares of the company in an offering of Capital Stock in the amount of $50,000.00. R V Wood was the company treasurer and signer of the shares which were sold on June 16, 1900. (Wood was well known and respected in town.)

At one time in Cheshire's history, Thomas J. Curtin owned and operated the lime kilns located in the Farnams section of Cheshire. His son, Thomas J. Curtin, Jr., owned and operated a silica sand quarry and mill located on the East side of Hoosac Lake (formerly known as the Cheshire Reservoir). (Thomas, Jr., was very active in town affairs, and served for many years as a selectman, moderator, and town accountant.)

The town's reputation for religious diversity continued, and in 1885 there were only 1,537 people in Cheshire but there were four different churches.

The rural town has been taking on recreational and residential overtones in modern times, with 225 acres (91 ha) of open slopes and wooded trails for skiers on Farnhams. There was in the 1940s a 0.75-mile (1.2 km) straight run at the Cheshire skiing area. In addition, there has been good fishing in the South Branch of the Hoosic River, which originates in Hoosac Lake in the town.

== Geography ==
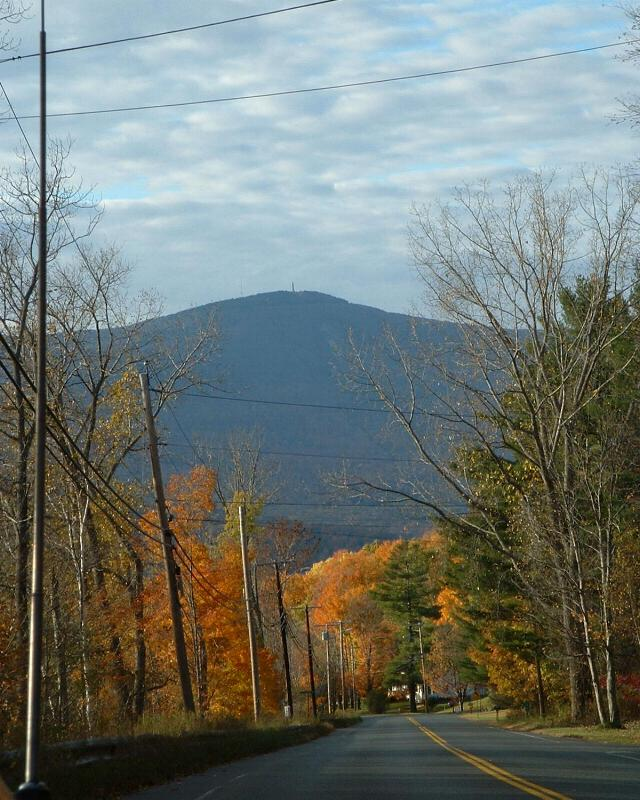
A view of Mount Greylock from the northeast part of town

According to the United States Census Bureau, the town has a total area of 27.5 square miles (71.3 km^{2}), of which 26.8 square miles (69.4 km^{2}) is land and 0.69 square miles (1.8 km^{2}), or 2.56%, is water.

Cheshire is located within the valley of the Hoosic River, and is the site of a dammed reservoir on the river. To the west, parts of Mount Greylock State Reservation take up sections of town, and includes a section of the auto road. To the southeast, North Mountain peaks just outside town limits before descending to the valley. The Appalachian Trail crosses through the center of town, heading from North Mountain to Mount Greylock. The southern foothills of the Hoosac Range make up much of the eastern side of town, and much of the land is dotted with sections of the Chalet and Stafford Hill Wildlife Management Areas. Several other brooks feed into the river along the way.

Cheshire is bounded by New Ashford to the northwest, Adams to the north, Savoy to the northeast, Windsor to the east, Dalton to the southeast, and Lanesborough to the south and west. Cheshire's town center is located 10.5 miles (16.9 km) northeast of Pittsfield, 53 miles (85 km) northwest of Springfield, and 135 miles (217 km) west-northwest of Boston (although the town is closer to Hartford and Albany than its own state capital).

== Transportation ==
Massachusetts Route 8 is the main route through town, crossing from south to north. It was once part of New England Interstate Route 8, which led from North Adams to Bridgeport, Connecticut. Route 116 also cuts through the northeast corner of town, and several sections provide panoramic views of Mount Greylock to the west.

The town lies along one of the routes of the Berkshire Regional Transit Authority bus line. Regional service can be found in both North Adams and Pittsfield, as can regional air service. The nearest airport with national service is Albany International Airport.

The town was formerly served by the Pittsfield and North Adams Railroad. Most of the line was converted into the Ashuwillticook Rail Trail /ˌæʃuːˈwɪltɪkʊk/, an 11-mile (18 km)-long, 10-foot-wide (3.0 m), universally accessible, paved path connecting the Berkshire towns of Lanesborough, Cheshire, and Adams. The trail runs parallel to Route 8 and passes through woods and marshlands, and alongside a lake and a river, with wooded hills and Mount Greylock as a backdrop. The path and has become a popular resource for biking, walking, roller-blading, jogging, etc. The trail passes through the Hoosic River valley, between Mount Greylock and the Hoosac Range. Cheshire Reservoir, the Hoosic River and associated wetland communities flank much of the trail, offering outstanding views and abundant wildlife.

== Demographics ==
Historical population
Year	Pop.	±%
1850	1,298	—
1860	1,533	+18.1%
1870	1,758	+14.7%
1880	1,537	−12.6%
1890	1,308	−14.9%
1900	1,221	−6.7%
1910	1,508	+23.5%
1920	1,476	−2.1%
1930	1,697	+15.0%
1940	1,708	+0.6%
1950	2,022	+18.4%
1960	2,472	+22.3%
1970	3,006	+21.6%
1980	3,124	+3.9%
1990	3,479	+11.4%
2000	3,401	−2.2%
2010	3,235	−4.9%
2020	3,258	+0.7%
2022*	3,215	−1.3%
* = population estimate. Source: United States census records and Population Estimates Program data.

As of the census of 2000, there were 3,401 people, 1,367 households, and 985 families residing in the town. The population density was 126.3 inhabitants per square mile (48.8/km^{2}). There were 1,470 housing units at an average density of 54.6 per square mile (21.1/km^{2}). The racial makeup of the town was 98.21% White, 0.38% African American, 0.09% Native American, 0.62% Asian, 0.06% from other races, and 0.65% from two or more races. Hispanic or Latino of any race were 0.44% of the population.

There were 1,367 households, out of which 30.5% had children under the age of 18 living with them, 59.8% were married couples living together, 8.4% had a female householder with no husband present, and 27.9% were non-families. Of all households 23.1% were made up of individuals, and 8.5% had someone living alone who was 65 years of age or older. The average household size was 2.49 and the average family size was 2.92.

In the town, the population was spread out, with 23.4% under the age of 18, 6.6% from 18 to 24, 27.6% from 25 to 44, 28.1% from 45 to 64, and 14.3% who were 65 years of age or older. The median age was 41 years. For every 100 females, there were 100.6 males. For every 100 females age 18 and over, there were 98.5 males.

The median income for a household in the town was $41,981, and the median income for a family was $53,885. Males had a median income of $40,205 versus $26,042 for females. The per capita income for the town was $19,156. About 4.6% of families and 6.6% of the population were below the poverty line, including 9.3% of those under age 18 and 6.3% of those age 65 or over.

== Government ==
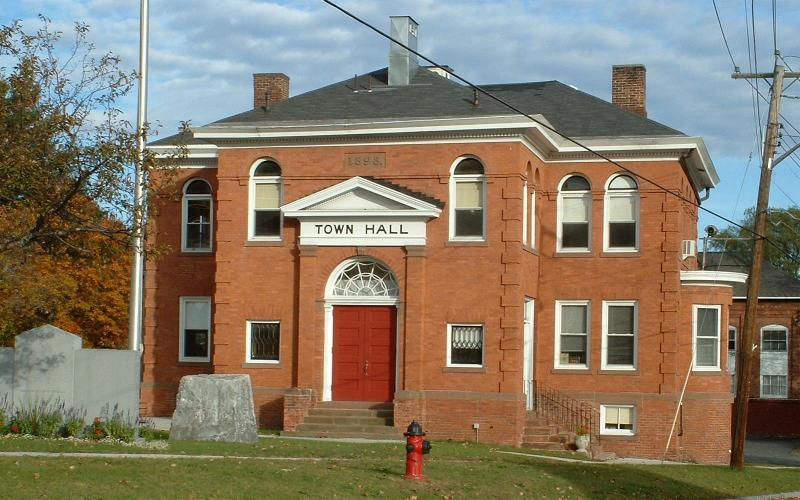
Cheshire Town Hall Complex

Cheshire employs the open town meeting form of government, and is led by a board of selectmen. Discussion is facilitated by the Moderator, Donna DeFino. The town operates its own services, such as police, fire and public works. The town's public library, which is attached to the town hall, is connected to the regional library network. The town is roughly located equidistantly between the North Adams Regional Hospital and Berkshire Medical Center in Pittsfield.

On the state level, Cheshire is represented in the Massachusetts House of Representatives as part of the First Berkshire District, which covers north Berkshire County and is represented by John Barrett. In the Massachusetts Senate, the town is part of the Berkshire, Hampshire and Franklin district, which includes all of Berkshire County and western Hampshire and Franklin counties, and is represented by Ben Downing. The town is home to the Fourth Station of Barracks "B" of the Massachusetts State Police.

On the national level, Cheshire is represented in the United States House of Representatives as part of Massachusetts's 1st congressional district, and has been represented by Richard Neal of Springfield since 2013. Massachusetts is currently represented in the United States Senate by senior Senator Elizabeth Warren and junior senator Ed Markey.

== Education ==
Cheshire is joined with Adams, and Savoy to form a regional school district. Cheshire's elementary school is located in Adams at Plunkett Elementary. Cheshire Elementary School was closed in 2017 as part of budget cuts in the school district. Both towns previously sent their middle school students to Adams Memorial Middle School in Adams. However, following a government grant to renovate and vastly improve the educational facilities at the district's high school, sixth through twelfth grade is held at Hoosac Valley High School. Private, parochial, charter and vocational schools can be found in Adams and North Adams.

The nearest community college is Berkshire Community College in Pittsfield. The nearest state college is Massachusetts College of Liberal Arts in North Adams, the nearest state university is Westfield State University, and the nearest private college is Williams College in Williamstown.

== Notable people ==
- John Leland, an influential Baptist pastor who came to Cheshire in 1792. He took the Cheshire Mammoth Cheese for President Jefferson to Washington
- Bernice Madigan, supercentenarian and one of the oldest verified people ever
- Guy H. Preston, US Army brigadier general, raised in Cheshire
- Horace Smith, inventor, gunsmith, co-founder of Smith & Wesson; born in Cheshire
- David Dunnels White, Medal of Honor nominee for capturing Major General Custis Lee, son of Robert E. Lee, at the Battle of Sailor's Creek, Virginia, April 6, 1865. He was born in Cheshire, Massachusetts, in 1844, and is buried in the Bozrah Cemetery in East Hawley, Massachusetts, in 1924
- E. B. Farnum, the first mayor of Deadwood
