= John Leland (Baptist) =

American Baptist minister (1754–1841)

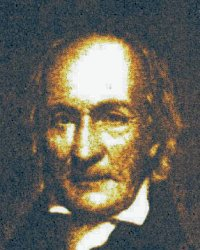
- John Leland
- Born: May 14, 1754; Grafton, Massachusetts
- Died: January 14, 1841 (aged 86); North Adams, Massachusetts
- Occupations: Baptist minister, Abolitionist, Hymn writer
- Known for: Preaching in Massachusetts and Virginia, Abolitionism, Religious Liberty
- Spouse: Sally Devine
- Children: Betsy, Hannah, Polly, John, Sally, Lucy, Fanny, Nancy, Lemuel

John Leland (May 14, 1754 – January 14, 1841) was an American Baptist minister and outspoken abolitionist who preached in Massachusetts and Virginia. He was an important figure in the struggle for freedom of religion in the United States. He also later opposed the rise of missionary societies among Baptists.

== Early life ==
Leland was born on May 14, 1754, in Grafton, Massachusetts. His parents were Congregationalists. He married Sally Devine, with whom he had nine children: Betsy, Hannah, Polly, John, Sally, Lucy, Fanny, Nancy, and Lemuel. Polly married Isaac Ford, son of revolutionary militia officer and New York Federalist politician Jacob Ford.

== Public life and views ==
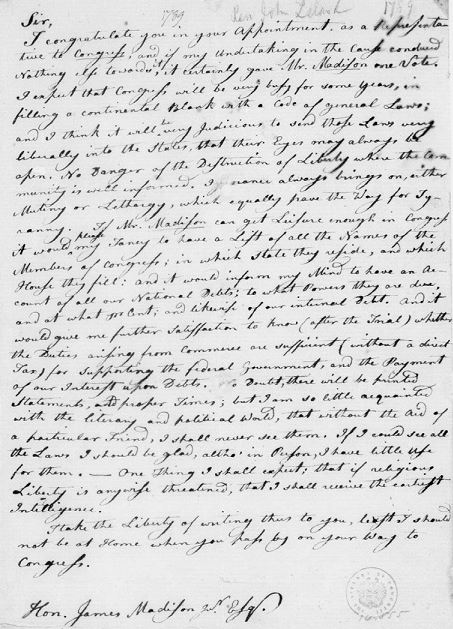
Leland's letter to James Madison

Leland was baptized in June 1774 by Elder Noah Alden. He joined the Baptist Church in Bellingham, Massachusetts, in 1775. He first visited Virginia from October 1775 till May 1776. He married Sally Devine on September 30th, 1776, and returned to Virginia with her shortly thereafter to become the pastor of Mt. Poney Baptist Church in Culpeper, Virginia, where he stayed till 1778. He then moved to Orange County, Virginia and began acting as an itinerant preacher, ranging between Orange and York County. The unincorporated community of Grafton, Virginia is believed to be named after his birthplace of Grafton, Massachusetts, based on his influence on the church there.

During the 1788–89 House of Representatives election, while still living in Virginia, Leland met with James Madison at the modern day location of Leland–Madison Memorial Park. There, Leland agreed not to oppose Madison in exchange for guarantees for religious freedom in the new Constitution. Madison was seated in the first Congress that same year and secured religious liberty in what became the First Amendment to the United States Constitution. Leland returned to Massachusetts in the winter of 1791, the same year the Bill of Rights was ratified, having left Virginia after an anti-slavery sermon.

Back in New England, Leland helped to found several Baptist congregations in Connecticut, to which President Thomas Jefferson would later write his famous letter to the Baptists of Danbury, Connecticut in 1802 regarding religious freedom.

In 1801, the people of Cheshire, Massachusetts made and sent a giant block of cheese to President Jefferson. Leland took the block from Cheshire to Washington, D.C., and presented it to Jefferson on January 1, 1802. While there, Leland was invited to preach to the Congress and the President. Of this incident he wrote that "In November, 1801 I journeyed to the south, as far as Washington, in charge of a cheese, sent to President Jefferson. Notwithstanding my trust, I preached all the way there and on my return. I had large congregations; let in part by curiosity to hear the Mammoth Priest, as I was called."

Constitutional scholar and author Michael I. Meyerson considers Leland was the most prominent religious figure of the founding era to champion universal religious freedom. Economist and author John M. Cobin argues that Leland seminally held to the "liberty of conscience" position on public policy theology.

Leland was elected to the Massachusetts House of Representatives and represented Cheshire in 1812.

Leland died on January 14, 1841, in North Adams, Massachusetts. His tombstone reads: "Here lies the body of John Leland, of Cheshire, who labored 67 years to promote piety and vindicate the civil and religious rights of all men."

Leland was known as a hymnwriter; "The Day Is Past and Gone, The Evening Shades Appear" has been included in 391 hymnals. Several of his hymns are preserved in the Sacred Harp.

The John Leland Center for Theological Studies in Virginia is named in Leland's honor. Leland himself opposed theological seminaries, but the school was named for Leland for three reasons: his firm stand for religious liberty for all, his opposition to slavery, and his service as a pastor and evangelist.

== Excerpts ==
- "The notion of a Christian commonwealth should be exploded forever...Government should protect every man in thinking and speaking freely, and see that one does not abuse another. The liberty I contend for is more than toleration. The very idea of toleration is despicable; it supposes that some have a pre-eminence above the rest to grant indulgence, whereas all should be equally free, Jews, Turks, Pagans and Christians." - A Chronicle of His Time in Virginia.
- "Truth disdains the aid of law for its defense — it will stand upon its own merits." - Right of Conscience Inalienable.
- "Every man must give account of himself to God, and therefore every man ought to be at liberty to serve God in a way that he can best reconcile to his conscience. If government can answer for individuals at the day of judgment, let men be controlled by it in religious matters; otherwise, let men be free." - Right of Conscience Inalienable.
- "Resolved, that slavery is a violent deprivation of rights of nature and inconsistent with a republican government, and therefore, recommend it to our brethren to make use of every legal measure to extirpate this horrid evil from the land; and pray Almighty God that our honorable legislature may have it in their power to proclaim the great jubilee, consistent with the principles of good policy." - Resolution for the General Committee of Virginia Baptists meeting in Richmond, Virginia, in 1789.

== Sources ==
- L. F. Greene, ed. (1845). The writings of the late Elder John Leland: including some events in his life. G.W. Wood. "John Leland."
- Gourley, Bruce (Winter 2005). "John Leland: Evolving Views of Slavery, 1789-1839". Baptist History and Heritage Journal. 40 (1).
- Crumm, David (14 January 2009). "John Leland honored as Interfaith Hero". ReadTheSpirit.com.
- Kimberling, Clark (1 March 2025). "John Leland and His Hymns" (PDF). University of Evansville.
