= Sibley House =

Sibley House may refer to:

in the United States (by state)

- Sibley-Corcoran House, Washington, Massachusetts, listed on the NRHP in Berkshire County, Massachusetts
- Sibley House (Detroit), listed on the NRHP in Michigan
- Sibley House Historic Site, Mendota, Minnesota, listed on the NRHP in Minnesota
- Hiram Sibley Homestead, Sibleyville, New York, listed on the NRHP in Monroe County, New York
