= Pettibone Farm =

- U.S. National Register of Historic Places
- U.S. Historic district
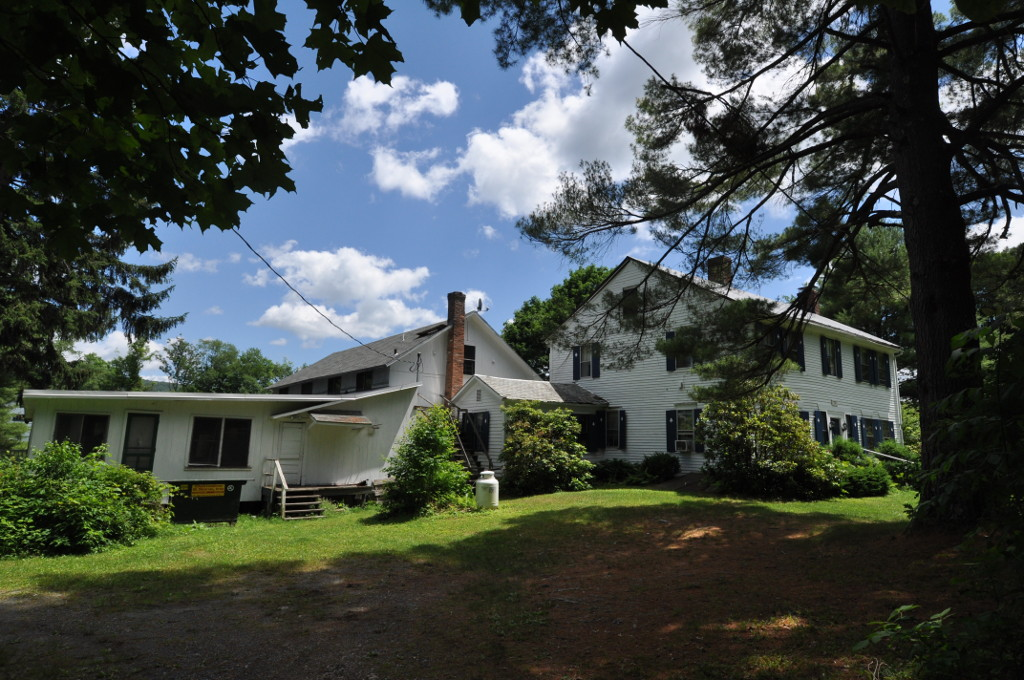

- Location within Massachusetts Location within the United States
- Location: Old Cheshire Rd., Lanesborough, Massachusetts
- Coordinates: 42°32′1″N 73°12′1″W
- Area: 4 acres (1.6 ha)
- Built: c. 1789
- Architectural style: Georgian; Federal
- NRHP reference No.: 90001944
- Added to NRHP: January 4, 1991

Pettibone Farm is a historic farm located on Old Cheshire Road north of the junction from Nobodys Road in Lanesborough, Massachusetts. The development began in the late 1780s, and with a long history of ownership by a single family the Pettibone Farm represents a well-preserved 19th-century rural farm complex. The complex includes the farmhouse and a number of 19th century outbuildings and was even listed on the National Register of Historic Places in 1991. It is now a home to a summer camp named Camp Mohawk.

== Description and history ==
Pettibone Farm is located in eastern Lanesborough, with most of its 90 acres (36 ha) located between Old Cheshire Road and Cheshire Reservoir. The centerpiece of the property is the farmhouse, which was built by Jonathan Pettibone, and went through numerous alterations in the 19th century, albeit without sacrificing much of its original Georgian and Federal period character. Located near the house are two 19th-century barns, whose exteriors have been only minimally altered, while the interiors have been adapted for summer camp functions.

It was the farmstead of Jonathan Pettibone, a leader of Lanesborough during the American Revolution. Pettibone purchased the property in 1768, and the present farmhouse was built about 1789, either by him or his son Amos, who took over the farm. It remained in the Pettibone family until 1865, when it was sold to Ira Jenks. The Jenks family owned it into the 20th century, when, after a succession of owners, it was acquired by the Schulman family. The Schulmans operate Camp Mohawk on the property.

== See also ==
- National Register of Historic Places listings in Berkshire County, Massachusetts
