= Dalton Grange Hall No. 23 =

- U.S. National Register of Historic Places
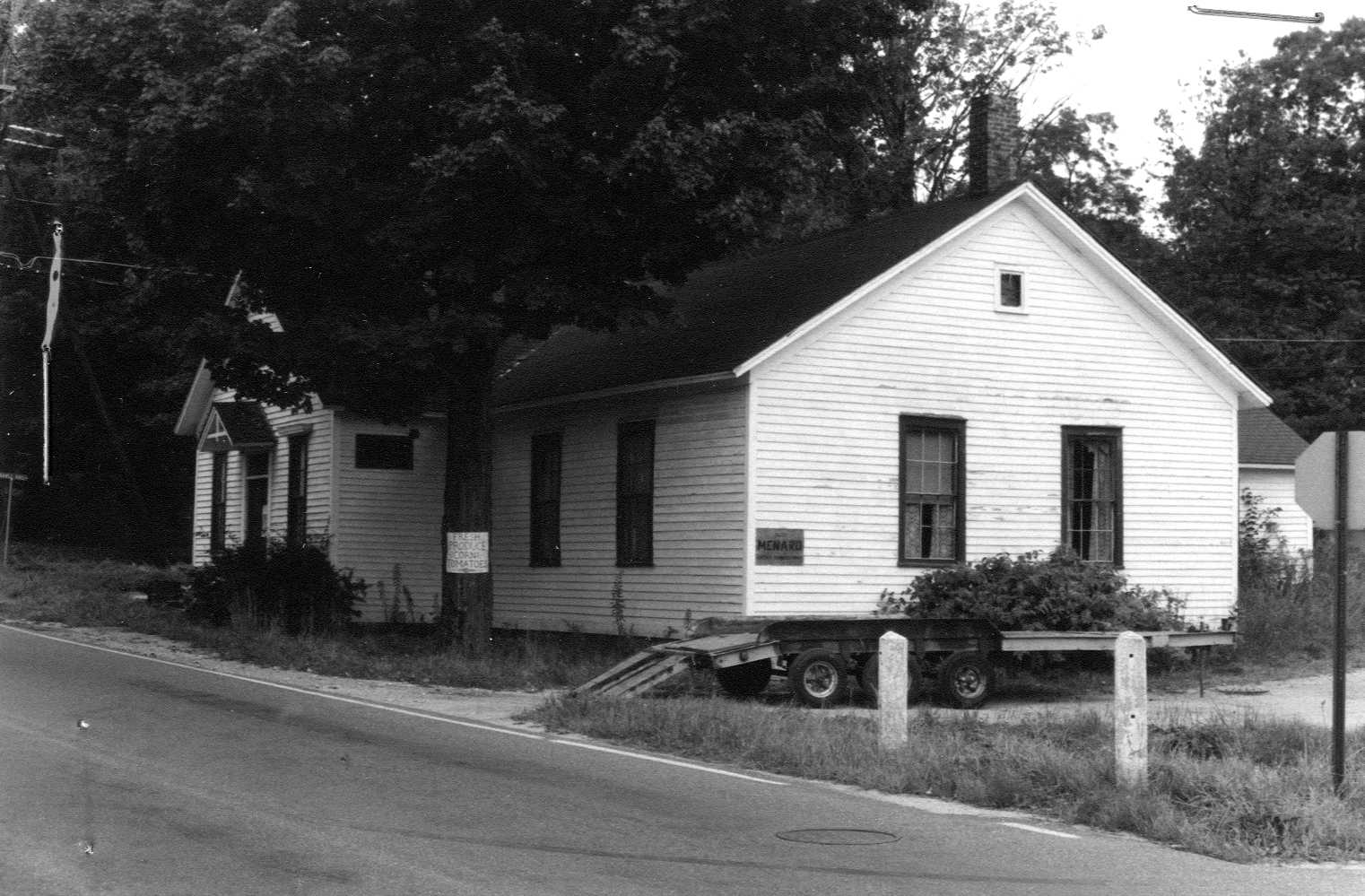
- c. 1980 photo

- Location within Massachusetts Location within the United States
- Location: South St. and Grange Hall Rd. Dalton, Massachusetts
- Coordinates: 42.460836°N 73.181548°W
- Built: 1879
- Architect: John S. Barton
- Architectural style: Late Victorian
- NRHP reference No.: 83003924
- Added to NRHP: November 10, 1983

Dalton Grange Hall No. 23 was a historic Grange hall in Dalton, Massachusetts. It was listed on the National Register of Historic Places in 1983, and demolished in 1987. Built in 1879, it was the first Grange hall to be built and owned by a Grange chapter in the state.

== Description ==
The Dalton Grange Hall was located in western Dalton, at the northeast corner of South Street and Grange Hall Road. It was a 1-1/2 story T-shaped wood frame structure, with a gabled roof and clapboarded exterior. It was stylistically vernacular, with modest Queen Anne features. The main facade had three bays, with sash windows flanking the entrance. The entrance was sheltered by a gabled hood.

== History ==
The Dalton Grange was founded in 1873, initially meeting in the Dalton Town Hall. Six years later the organization raised funds, received donations of materials and land, and constructed this hall for $300. The building was first used (in an unfinished state) in May 1879, and was formally dedicated December 10, 1879. It was the first Grange hall in the state to be owned by the membership. The building became a social center in the town, and was expanded c. 1900, adding a dining hall and kitchen. A bowling alley was added at the same time. In the 20th century the hall played host to a number of civic activities and organizations. After World War II the decline in agriculture in the area led to an aging membership, and a decline in the ability to maintain the facilities. Despite appeals for assistance from the state-level grange, the building was demolished in 1987. A boulder with a plaque mounted on it now commemorates the site.

== See also ==
- National Register of Historic Places listings in Berkshire County, Massachusetts
