= Clark–Eames House =

Historic house in Massachusetts, United States

- U.S. National Register of Historic Places
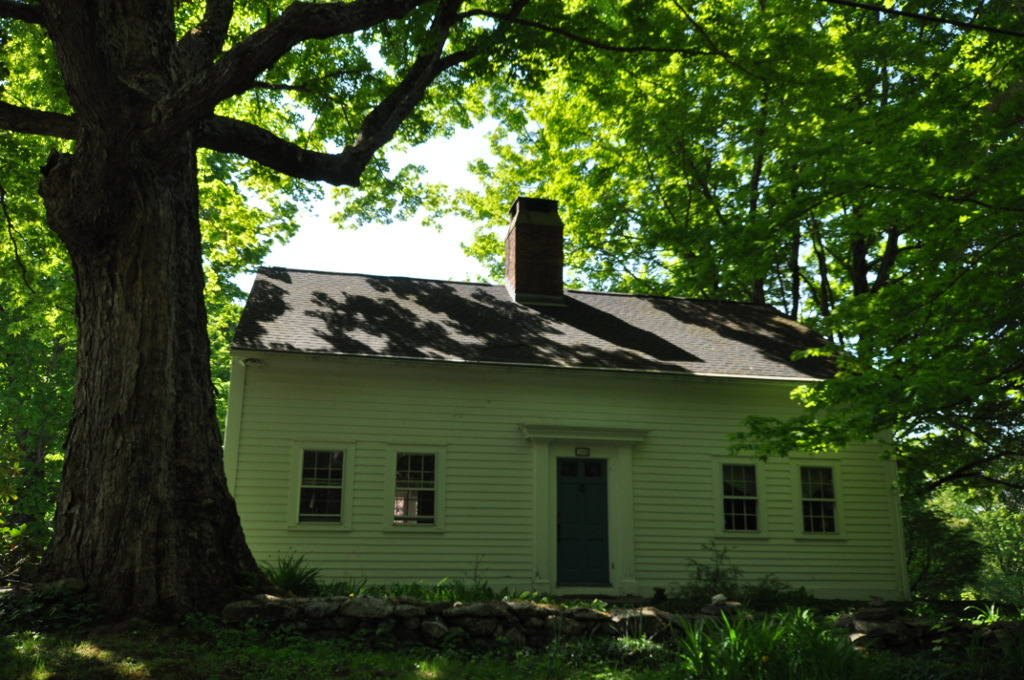

- Location within Massachusetts Location within the United States
- Location: 230 Middlefield Rd., Washington, Massachusetts
- Coordinates: 42°20′36″N 73°04′30″W
- Area: 2 acres (0.81 ha)
- Built: c. 1790
- Architectural style: Federal
- MPS: Washington MRA
- NRHP reference No.: 86002139
- Added to NRHP: September 12, 1986

The Clark–Eames House is a historic house located at 230 Middlefield Road in Washington, Massachusetts. Probably built around 1790, it is one of the town's few surviving 18th-century houses. It was listed on the National Register of Historic Places in 1986.

== Description and history ==
The Clark–Eames House is located in a rural setting in the southeastern corner of Washington; the closest village is that of Becket to the southwest. It is located on the southeast side of Middlefield Road, roughly opposite its junction with Johnson Hill Road. It is a 1 1/2-story wood-frame structure, with a side-gable roof, central chimney, and clapboarded exterior. Its five-bay front facade has simple Federal period styling, with simple moulded surrounds around the windows, and a center entrance with flanking pilasters and a corniced entablature. In the late 19th century, the entrance was sheltered by a gable-roof hood with Victorian styling, but that has since been removed.

It is one of only a handful houses constructed in the area during the 18th century, with a construction date sometime between 1782 and 1797. Its presence in a remote corner of the town exemplifies the town's dispersed form of settlement. The house was the seat of a 70-acre (28 ha) farm for most of the 19th century. It now serves as a vacation residence, show another trend on how the town's economy has changed in the 20th century.

== See also ==
- National Register of Historic Places listings in Berkshire County, Massachusetts
