= Hancock Town Hall =

- U.S. National Register of Historic Places
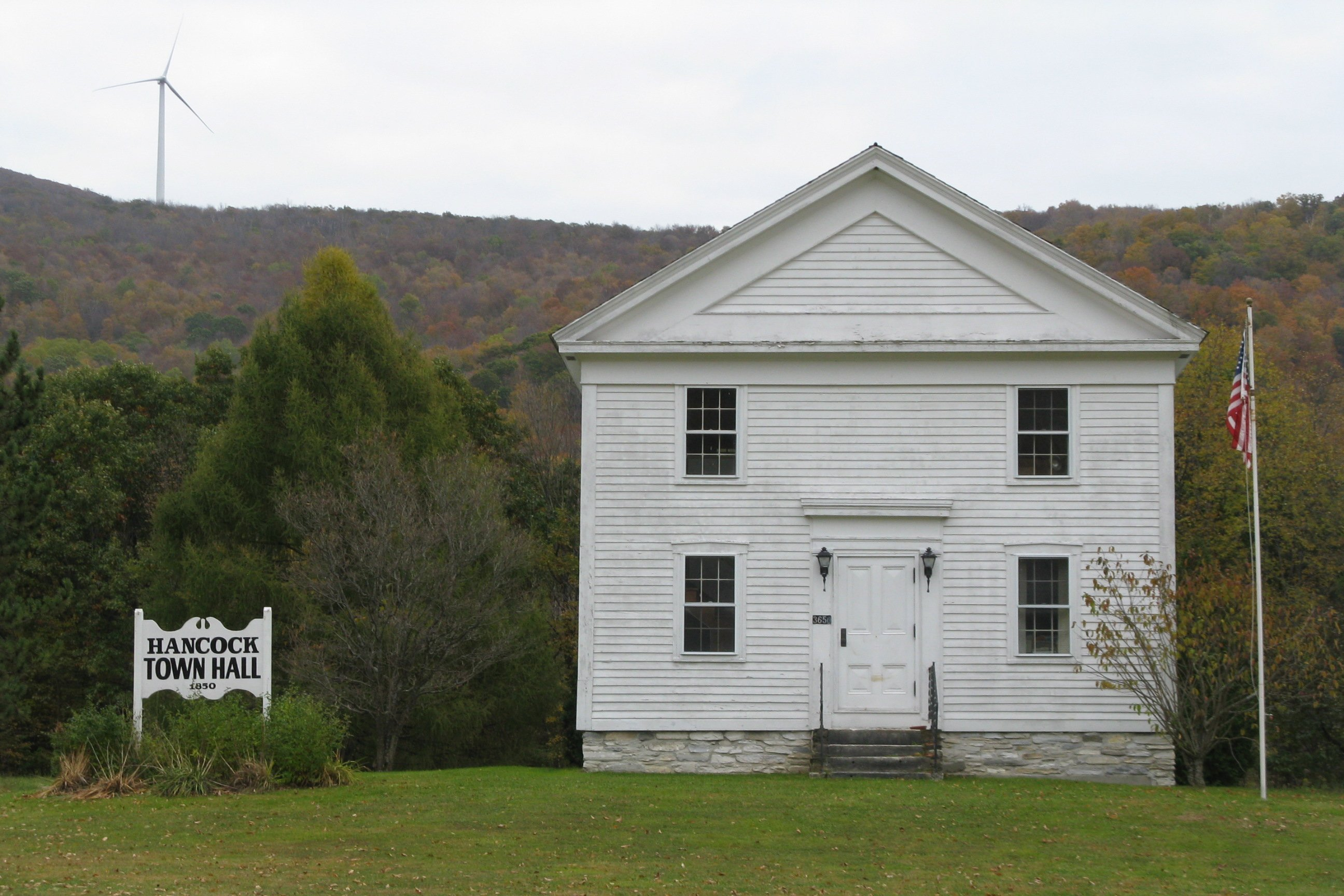
- Hancock Town Hall

- Location within Massachusetts Location within the United States
- Location: MA 43, Hancock, Massachusetts
- Coordinates: 42°32′53″N 73°18′39″W
- Area: 2 acres (0.81 ha)
- Built: 1852
- Architectural style: Greek Revival
- NRHP reference No.: 73001956
- Added to NRHP: February 6, 1973; September 26, 1975

Hancock Town Hall is a historic town hall on Massachusetts Route 43 in Hancock, Massachusetts. It was constructed in the Greek Revival style c. 1852, using timbers from a previous meeting house. The building served a number of municipal purposes, including library, school, town offices, and town meeting space. In preparation for the town's celebration of the nation's bicentennial, the hall was moved in 1975 to a lot adjacent to the town cemetery and restored. The hall was listed on the National Register of Historic Places in 1973. After being delisted for being moved, it was relisted in 1975.

== Description and history ==
Hancock Town Hall is located in central Hancock, in a rural setting on the east side of Massachusetts Route 43, just south of the town cemetery. It is a two-story wood frame structure, with a gabled roof and clapboarded exterior. The main facade is three bays wide, with a center entrance topped by a corniced entablature. The flanking bays have sash windows, with those on the first floor topped by slightly peaked lintels. The building has plain corner boards, which rise to an entablature that encircles the building. The front gable is fully pedimented, with a triangular panel in the center.

The town hall was built about 1852, using timber salvaged from a church that was being demolished. It is one of only three purpose-built 19th-century town halls in all of Berkshire County. It was originally located in the town's village center, where in addition to housing town facilities and functions, it also housed a private secondary school for a number of years. It served as the town's civic center until 1958, when offices and town meetings were relocated to other facilities. In 1973, the town decided to rehabilitate the building, restoring its use for town meetings. It was moved in 1975 to its present location, and was upgraded with electricity and plumbing. The move resulted in its delisting from the National Register, which was restored later in 1975.

== See also ==
- National Register of Historic Places listings in Berkshire County, Massachusetts
