= Tyringham Center School =

- U.S. National Register of Historic Places
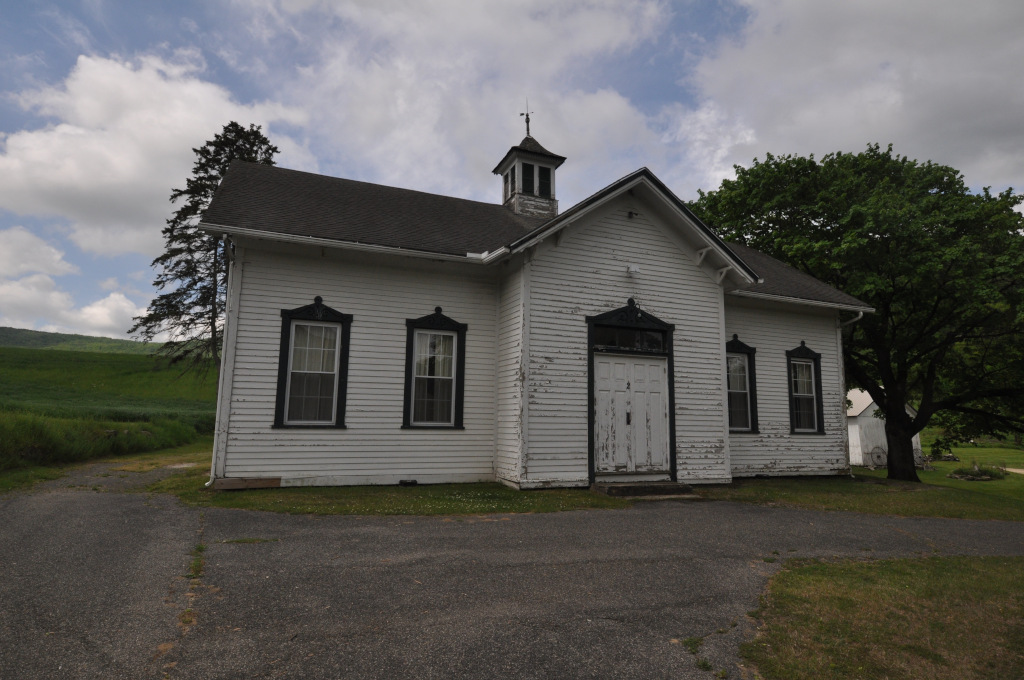

- Location within Massachusetts Location within the United States
- Location: 2 Church Rd., Tyringham, Massachusetts
- Coordinates: 42°25′48″N 73°15′38″W
- Area: 1 acre (0.40 ha)
- Built: 1877
- Architectural style: Italianate
- NRHP reference No.: 100005764
- Added to NRHP: November 5, 2020

The Tyringham Center School is a historic schoolhouse at 2 Church Road in Tyringham, Berkshire County, Massachusetts. Built in 1877, it is the town's only surviving 19th-century schoolhouse, and one of Berkshire County's only schoolhouses to survive from the second half of the 19th century. It was listed on the National Register of Historic Places in 2020.

== Description and history ==
The Tyringham Center School stands in the town center of the rural community, at the southwest corner of Church and Jerusalem Roads. It is a wood-frame structure, mostly a single story in height, with a cruciform plan covered by a gabled roof. The roof is capped by a small square cupola which still houses the original school bell, and has gingerbread trim at its edges. Its layout includes two classrooms, a projecting centered entry, and a rear two-story ell housing utilities and bathrooms.

The school was built in 1876–77, replacing a one-room schoolhouse which stood on the same property. That school was one of six district schools in the town. This replacement served as the town's first graded school, with younger children in one of the classrooms (serving just the district), and older children (from across the town) in the other. Of the town's six pre-20th century schools, it is the only one still standing, and it is the only 19th-century school of its type to survive in all of Berkshire County. The school was built by Charles Videtto, a local master carpenter, and remained in use as a school until 1978. It has seen a variety of municipal uses since, mainly for office and storage space.

== See also ==
- National Register of Historic Places listings in Berkshire County, Massachusetts
