= Philip Eames House =

Historic house in Massachusetts, United States

- U.S. National Register of Historic Places
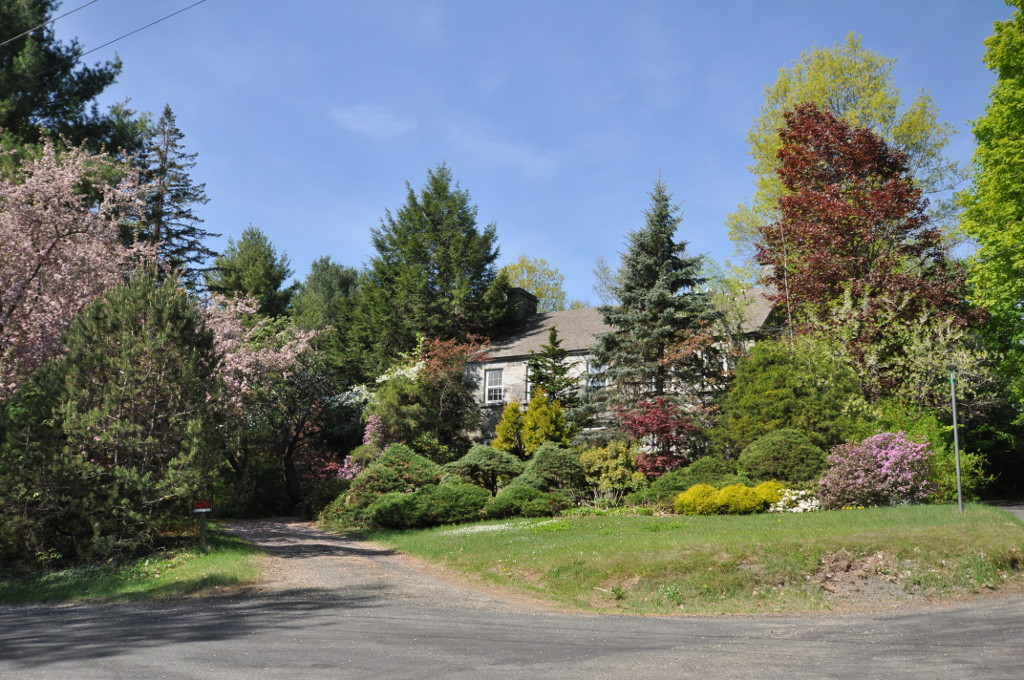

- Location within Massachusetts Location within the United States
- Location: 88 Stone House Rd., Washington, Massachusetts
- Coordinates: 42°22′18″N 73°7′9″W
- Area: 1 acre (0.40 ha)
- Built: 1843
- Architectural style: Greek Revival, Federal
- MPS: Washington MRA
- NRHP reference No.: 86002140
- Added to NRHP: September 12, 1986

The Philip Eames House is a historic stone house in Washington, Massachusetts. Built in 1843 for a local mill owner, it is one of the community's finest 19th-century houses, with Federal and Greek Revival styling. It was listed on the National Register of Historic Places in 1986.

== Description and history ==
The Philip Eames House is located in rural eastern Washington, at the southwest corner of Summit Hill Road and Stone House Road. It is a 2 1/2-story masonry structure, built out of irregularly cut granite, with a gabled roof and brick chimneys. Its main facade is five bays wide, with its center entrance set in a segmented-arch opening framed by pilasters and a keystoned arch. The entry is flanked by sidelight windows and topped by a fanlight transom. The gable ends are fully pedimented in the Greek Revival style, and are also built of granite.

The house was built in 1843, and is characterized in its National Register nomination as the town's "most imposing 19th century residence". Local lore says that some of the building materials came from the construction of the nearby railroad line, whose 1838 construction required blasting a deep cut through solid rock. Philip Eames, for whom the house was built, was the local operator of a number of saw mills. The Eames family's 1764 homestead, where he was born, stood nearby until the early 20th century.

== See also ==
- National Register of Historic Places listings in Berkshire County, Massachusetts
