= Boston Finishing Works =

- U.S. National Register of Historic Places
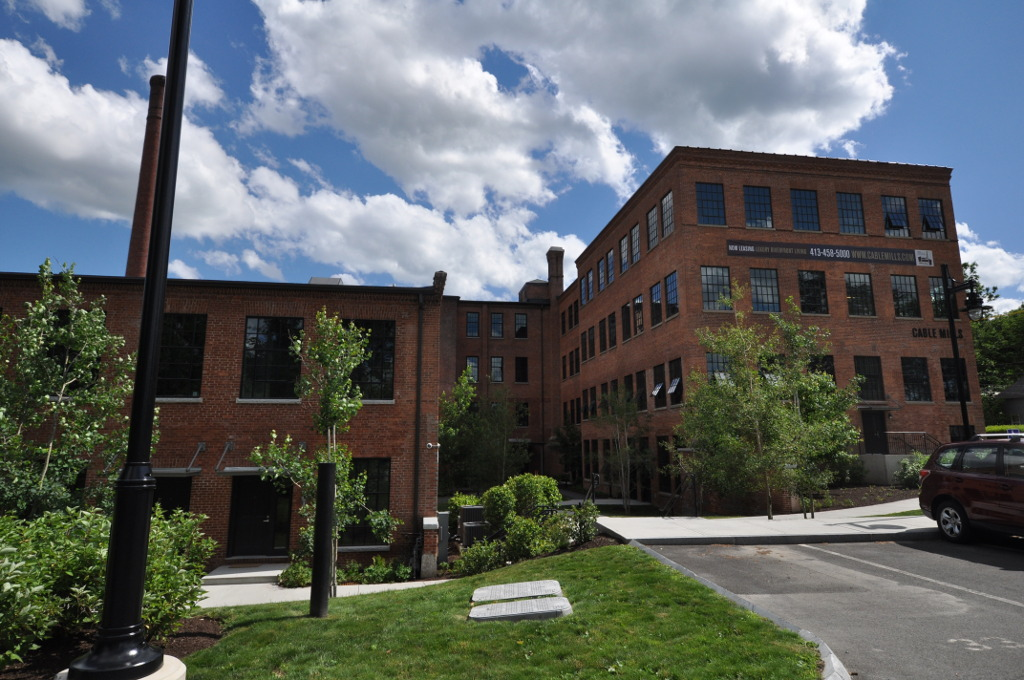

- Location within Massachusetts Location within the United States
- Location: 160 Water St., Williamstown, Massachusetts
- Coordinates: 42°42′23″N 73°12′2″W
- Area: 8.8 acres (3.6 ha)
- Built: 1873
- Architectural style: Colonial Revival
- NRHP reference No.: 16000690
- Added to NRHP: October 4, 2016

The Boston Finishing Works is a historic industrial factory complex at 160 Water Street in Williamstown, Massachusetts. The site was developed industrially beginning in 1873, and was in regular use until 2000 as one of the town's major industrial employers. It was listed on the National Register of Historic Places in 2016.

== Description and history ==
The Boston Finishing Works plant occupies about 9 acres (3.6 ha) of land in southeastern Williamstown, bounded on the west by Water Street and the east by the Green River, which was the plant's original source of power. The plant has eight surviving buildings, out of a historical maximum of more than twenty. Five of these form the plant's main building, a brick three-story structure with one and two-story wings. Two other buildings are joined into an L-shaped footprint; one of them, built in 1873, is the oldest surviving building on the property. The property also includes archaeological remnants of the waterworks that originally powered the plant, including a sluiceway and filled-in mill pond.

The industrial history of the site begins in 1873, when Arthur Loop founded a company that produced cotton twine on the premises. Although business boomed after the railroad arrived in 1875, the company closed in 1883 with the death of one of its major backers. The site was taken over in 1892 and expanded by the Boston Finishing Works, which specialized in the finishing of unprocessed cotton cloth. That company closed in 1906, and the site was next used for the production of corduroy and velvet fabrics. In 1930 the site was converted into an automotive maintenance and repair facility, and in 1936 it was purchased by Cornish Wire, which manufactured electrical wires and cabling until 1960. This business declined through the 1970s and 1980s, and its last owner closed it in 2000. In 2005, the town's historic commission ordered the demolition of most of its post-1930 buildings, retaining only the older buildings of the complex.

== See also ==
- National Register of Historic Places listings in Berkshire County, Massachusetts
