= Clinton African Methodist Episcopal Zion Church =

Historic church in Massachusetts, United States

- U.S. National Register of Historic Places
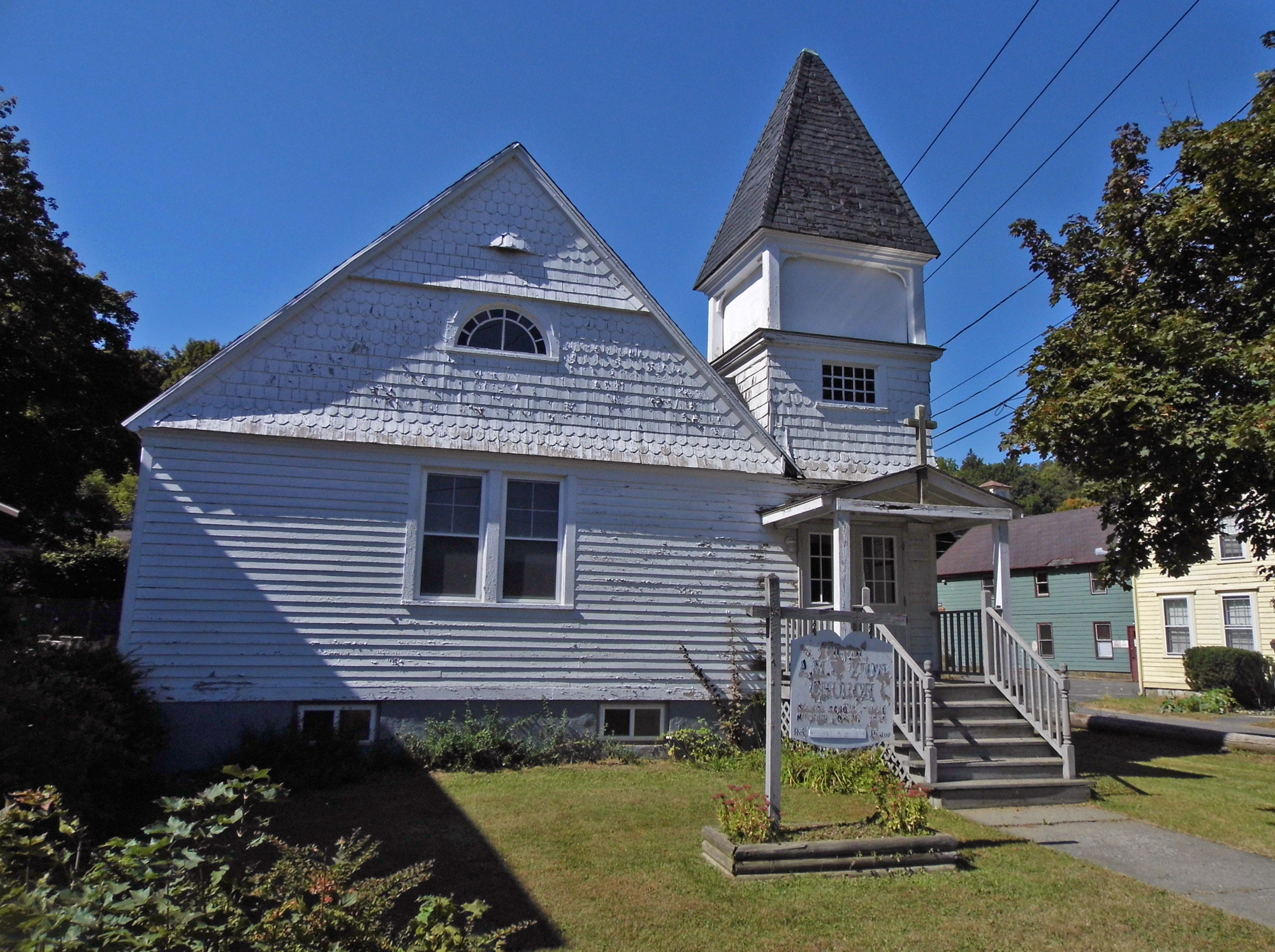

- Location within Massachusetts Location within the United States
- Location: 9 Elm Ct., Great Barrington, Massachusetts
- Coordinates: 42°11′48″N 73°21′46″W
- Area: less than one acre
- Architectural style: Shingle style
- NRHP reference No.: 08000464
- Added to NRHP: May 29, 2008

The Clinton African Methodist Episcopal Zion Church is a historic church at 9 Elm Court in Great Barrington, Massachusetts. It was the first African American church in Berkshire County, and it was a place where noted Great Barrington native W.E.B. Du Bois is known to have attended services. The Shingle style church was completed in 1887, and served as a center of African American worship in southern Berkshire County for over a century.

== History ==
African Americans have been resident in Berkshire County, Massachusetts since colonial days. Some were slaves, while others were either freemen or escaped slaves. Prior to the establishment of the Clinton AME church, these people attended church services with the county's white population. After the American Civil War there was an influx of southern African Americans into the area, and an informal AME congregation began to take shape as early as the 1860s. In 1881, this congregation, consisting of a blend of newer southern and older northern African American families, acquired the land on Elm Court where their church would be erected in 1887. Challenges in raising funds postponed the beginning of construction until 1886, and the church was officially dedicated the following year. The Shingle style structure cost $4,275. Attendees of the church are known to include the future civil rights activist W.E.B. Du Bois, whose uncle was active in the congregation. Its membership is responsible for the establishment of other African American church congregations elsewhere in the county.

In 1938, after a successful fundraising campaign, the congregation added a parsonage to the property. The church basement was finished in the 1940s and 1950s to provide a location for social functions, and the church has since then had its original doors and windows replaced, albeit in a historically sensitive way. The church was listed on the National Register of Historic Places in 2008.

The church closed in 2014; in 2017, it came under the auspices of the Clinton Church Restoration (now the W.E.B. Du Bois Center of Freedom and Democracy), which is restoring the church as a historical center honoring Du Bois and the African American community in Berkshire County.

== Description ==
The basic structure of the church as built in the 1880s was a rectangular block measuring 55' by 24', with a truss roof. The gable ends of the building were shingled with decorative shingles. A 30-foot (9.1 m) tower is attached at the northeast corner of the building, which also provides a vestibule space separating the main entrance from the sanctuary. The sanctuary measures 39' by 24', lined with twenty pews; there are four windows on each side, containing some stained glass decoration. The pulpit, made of ash, stands to the right, while a platform for the choir and organ stands to the left at the front of the sanctuary. The sanctuary walls were originally wainscoted; this work has been covered by paneling. Behind the sanctuary is a vestry room, somewhat altered from the original by the addition of the parsonage in the 1930s.

When originally built, the church had a trap door in the southeast corner to gain access to the basement. In 1951 this was replaced by stairs to provide access to the finished basement space. The basement space has a low ceiling, and roughly matches the dimensions of the sanctuary above. A space on the west side of the basement houses kitchen facilities and the church's heating system, which extend to some extent under the parsonage.

The parsonage has a basic center hall floor plan, with the living room occupying part of the original church vestry. The second floor contains three bedrooms and a bathroom. The parsonage space is little altered since its construction in the 1930s.

== See also ==
- National Register of Historic Places listings in Berkshire County, Massachusetts
