= East Lawn Cemetery and Sherman Burbank Memorial Chapel =

Historic site in Berkshire County, Massachusetts

- U.S. National Register of Historic Places
- U.S. Historic district
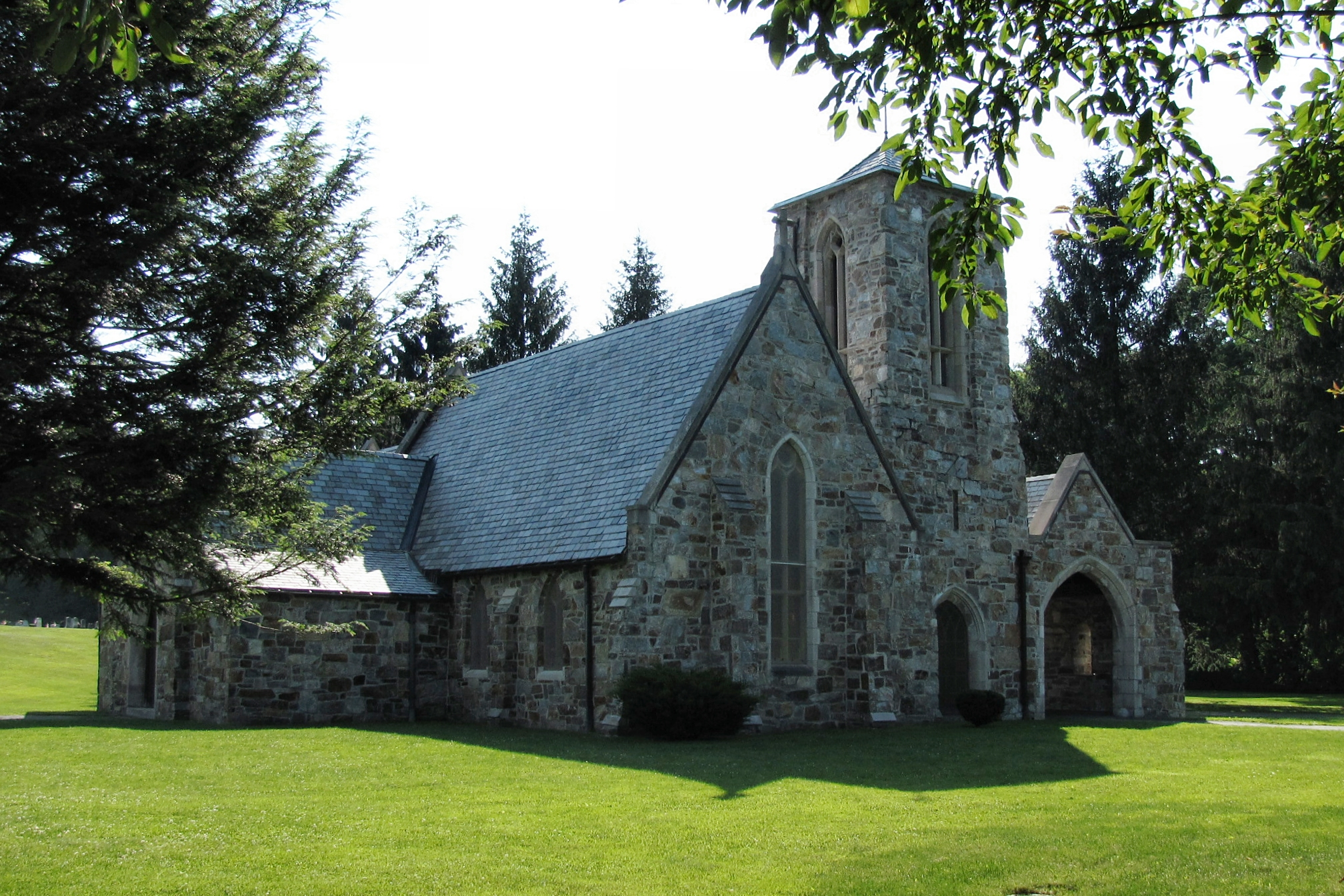
- Sherman Burbank Memorial Chapel

- Location within Massachusetts Location within the United States
- Location: Williamstown, Massachusetts
- Coordinates: 42°42′27″N 73°11′47″W
- Built: 1842
- Architect: Watson, Frank Rushmore; Deans, David McN.
- Architectural style: Late Gothic Revival
- NRHP reference No.: 00001086
- Added to NRHP: September 14, 2000

East Lawn Cemetery and Sherman Burbank Memorial Chapel is a historic cemetery and chapel at 605 Main Street in Williamstown, Massachusetts, United States. Established in 1842, it is the newest and largest cemetery in Williamstown; the two older cemeteries date to the 18th century. It was established at a time when West Lawn Cemetery (established 1766) was in need of expansion, and this site was chosen for the location of a new cemetery. The initial few acres of land were donated by Asahel Foote, who sat on the committee formed to investigate the town's cemetery needs. The cemetery grew in size over the next several decades, reaching a size of about 40 acres (16 ha) by the early 20th century. Approximately half of the cemetery (representing its developed portion) and its associated chapel were listed on the National Register of Historic Places in 2000.

The Sherman Burbank Memorial Chapel was designed in 1935 by Frank Rushmore Watson in the Late Gothic Revival style, and dedicated in 1937. An associated cottage, probably intended for a caretaker, was also planned but never built. The funding for the chapel came from Sherman H. Banks of Pottstown, Pennsylvania, whose mother was from the Sherman family that was one of Williamstown's oldest. The chapel is located near the cemetery entrance, not far from Main Street. In addition to the main chapel chamber, it has a space off to one side for use as a receiving vault, and a porte cochere with a small hall and other facilities on the west side.

== See also ==
- National Register of Historic Places listings in Berkshire County, Massachusetts
