= Wheeler Family Farmstead =

Historic house in Massachusetts, United States

- U.S. National Register of Historic Places
- U.S. Historic district
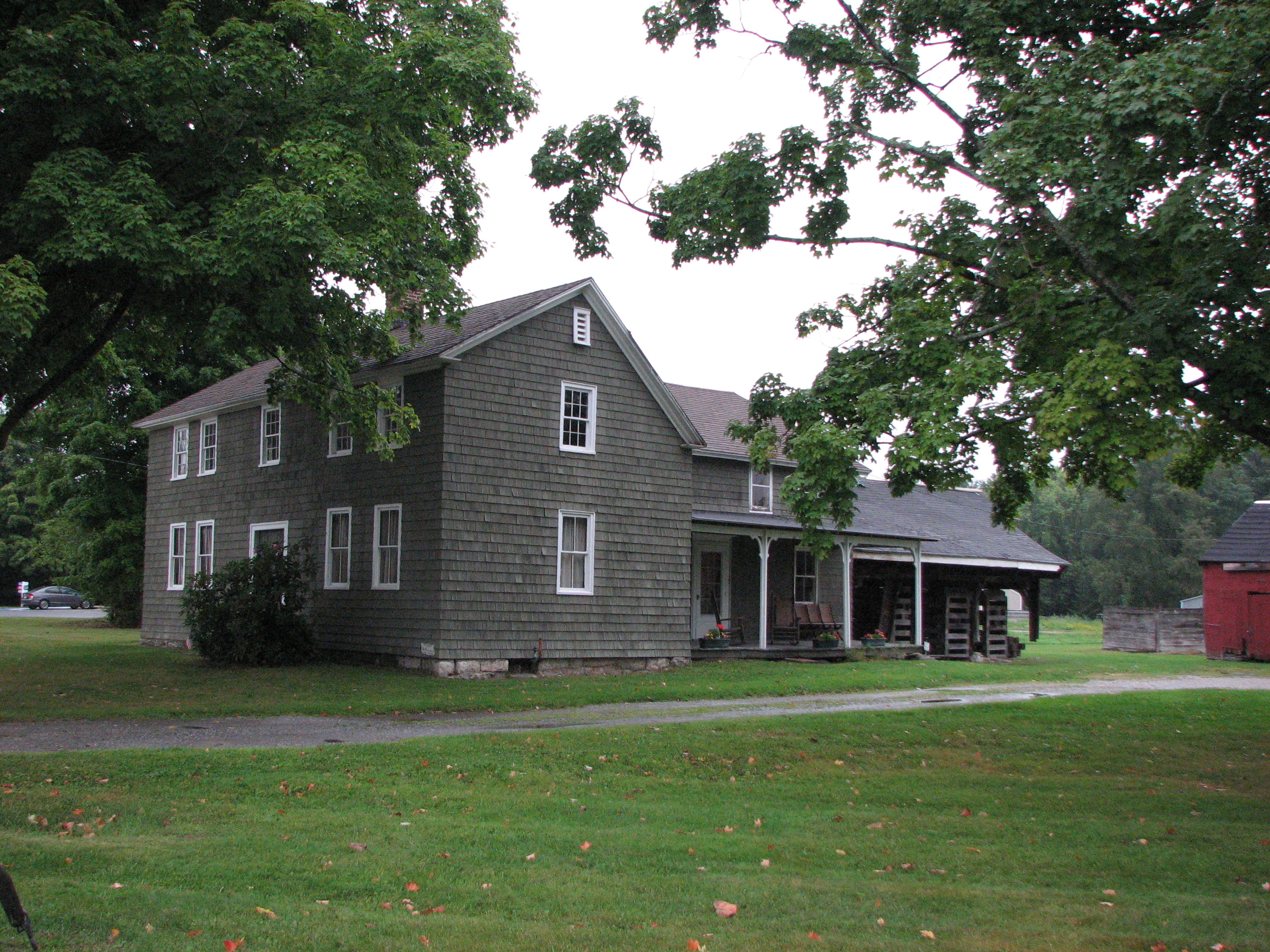

- Location within Massachusetts Location within the United States
- Location: 817 S. Main St., Great Barrington, Massachusetts
- Coordinates: 42°10′43″N 73°21′46″W
- Area: 1.5 acres (0.61 ha)
- Built: c. 1733
- NRHP reference No.: 11000614
- Added to NRHP: September 6, 2011

The Wheeler Family Farmstead is a historic farm complex at 817 South Main Street in Great Barrington, Massachusetts. The farmhouse has elements dating to the 1730s, including evidence of building methods used by Dutch settlers of the Hudson River valley, and has been successively modified in each of the following centuries, with the last significant work occurring in the 1920s. All of the surviving farm buildings in the complex are at least 90 years old, and some date to the 19th century. The property was listed on the National Register of Historic Places in 2011, and is now the museum and headquarters of the Great Barrington Historical Society.

== Description and history ==
The Wheeler farm complex sits on a 1.5-acre (0.61 ha) parcel of land between United States Route 7 and the Housatonic River that is a remnant of what was once a much larger farm, extending from the river to the east and beyond the road to the west. The farmstead, located on the east side of the road, includes the main house, several barns and stables, a carriage house, and a silo. The farmhouse is a 2 1/2-story wood-frame structure, with a gabled roof and wooden shingled exterior. It has a symmetrical five-bay front facade, with simply framed windows and center entrance. Despite the symmetry, the building is an amalgam of additive elements, revealing construction methods across over 150 years of time. The oldest portion of the house, its northwest chamber, was built about 1733, using construction methods of Dutch origin. The building achieved its basic present form after a series of additions later in the 19th century, mostly by members of the Wheeler family who purchased it in 1747.

The property also exhibits evidence of Native American habitation prior to the arrival of European colonists. The property was purchased by Truman Wheeler in 1764, a native of Connecticut, who operated a store in the house until his death in 1815. He was also active in civic affairs, and served in the local militia in leading roles during the American Revolutionary War. The farm was occupied by members of the Wheeler family until 1988, and was conveyed by the heirs of the last residents to the Great Barrington Historical Society in 2008.

== See also ==
- National Register of Historic Places listings in Berkshire County, Massachusetts
