= Hall's Tavern (Cheshire, Massachusetts) =

- U.S. National Register of Historic Places
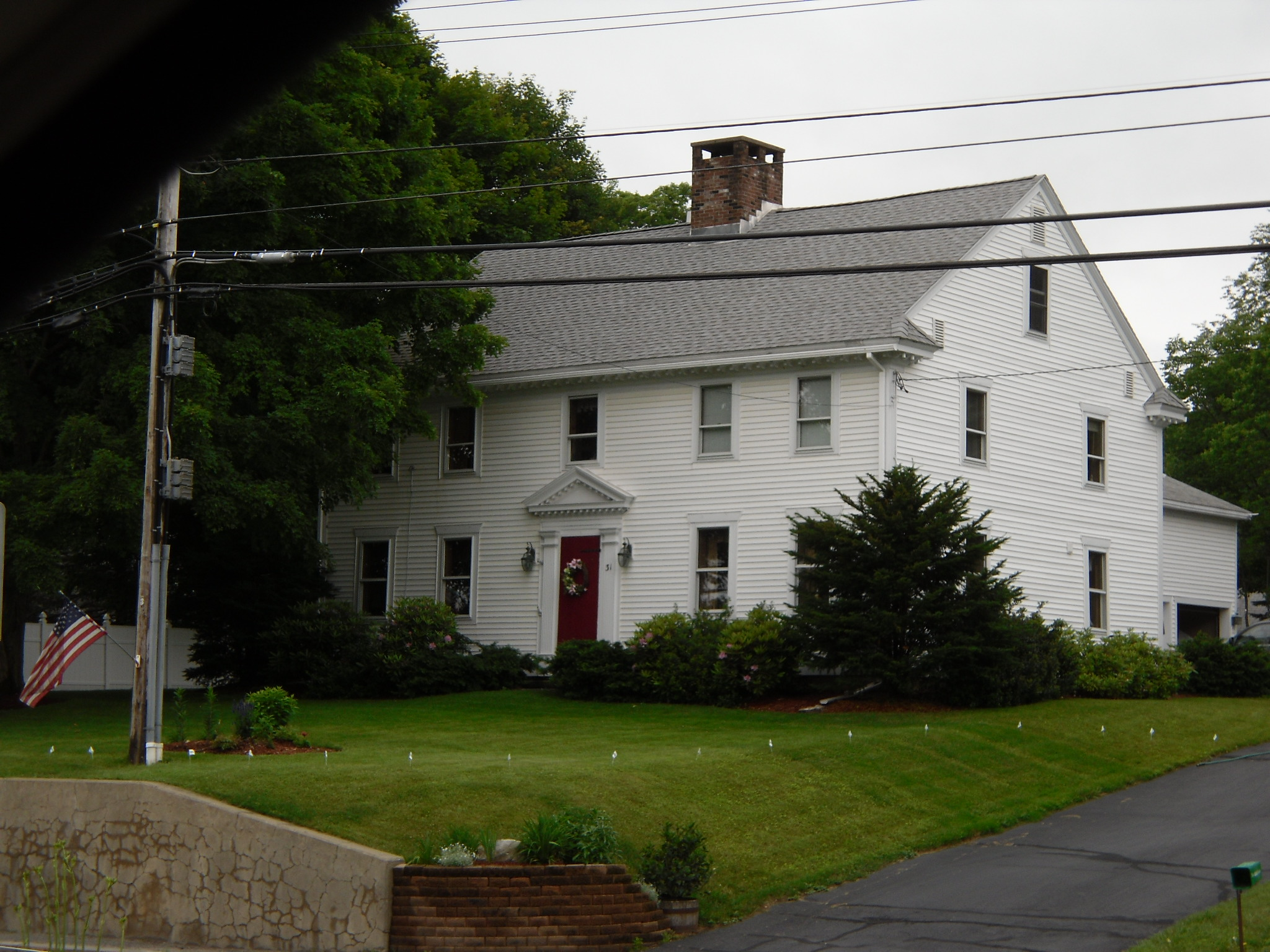

- Location within Massachusetts Location within the United States
- Location: 41 North St., Cheshire, Massachusetts
- Coordinates: 42°33′46″N 73°9′58″W
- Area: less than one acre
- Built: 1804
- Architect: Hall, Calvin; Leland, John, Jr.
- Architectural style: Federal
- NRHP reference No.: 83000568
- Added to NRHP: March 10, 1983

Hall's Tavern is a historic tavern at 41 North Street in Cheshire, Massachusetts. Built in 1804, it is a prominent local example of Federal period architecture, and an important local meeting place in the 19th century. Now a private residence, it was added to the National Register of Historic Places in 1983.

== Description and history ==
The former Hall's Tavern is located in the village center of Cheshire, on the west side of North Street (Massachusetts Route 8) north of its junction with West Mountain Road and directly opposite the First Baptist Church. It is a 2-1/2 story wood frame structure, five bays wide, with a large central chimney. Its centered doorway is flanked by pilasters and topped by a triangular pediment. Windows are set in rectangular openings, with splayed wooden lintels. The interior follows a typical central chimney plan, with parlors on either side of the chimney, and a narrow entry vestibule with a winding staircase. The rear half of the structure consists of a large central chamber (historically the kitchen), and two small chambers in the corners.

The tavern was built in 1804 for Calvin Hall, a veteran of the American Revolutionary War. It was operated as a tavern, and was notable in part for housing British prisoners of war during the War of 1812. It also hosted meetings of a regional Masonic lodge in the 19th century. Hall sold the property in 1816 to the Cole family, who owned it for 130 years. The building has since seen use as a private residence, and as a retail establishment.

== See also ==
- National Register of Historic Places listings in Berkshire County, Massachusetts
