= Northeast School =

- U.S. National Register of Historic Places
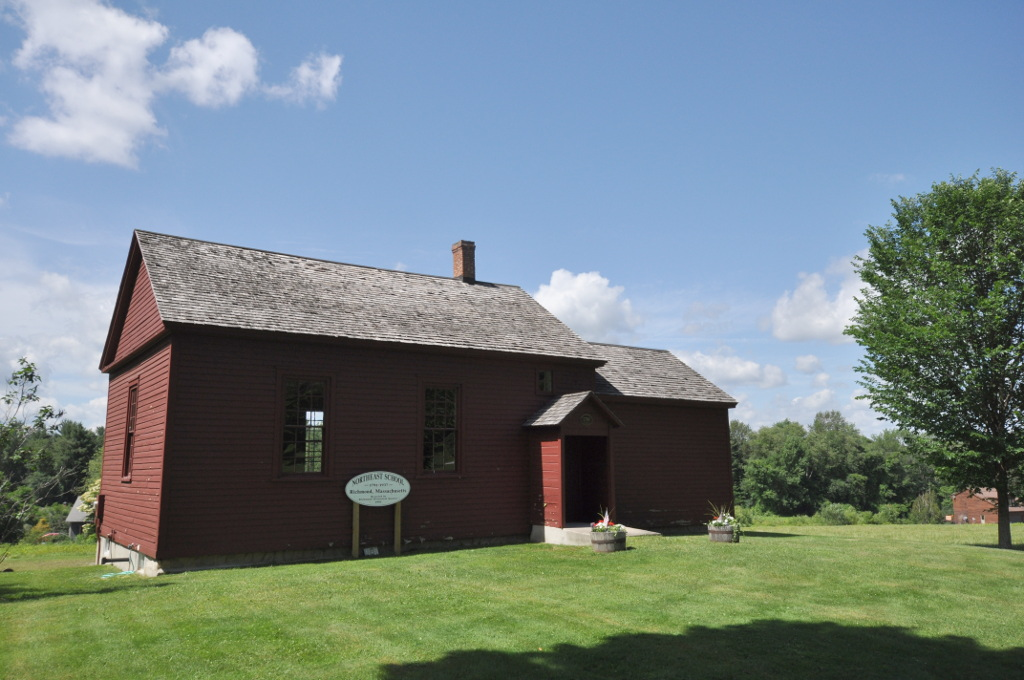

- Location within Massachusetts Location within the United States
- Location: 981 Summit Rd., Richmond, Massachusetts
- Coordinates: 42°24′00″N 73°19′53″W
- Area: 3.17 acres (1.28 ha)
- Built: c. 1791
- Architect: Stiles, J.B.
- Architectural style: Federal
- NRHP reference No.: 02000902
- Added to NRHP: August 30, 2002

The Northeast School (or District No. 1 School) is a historic school building at 981 Summit Road in Richmond, Massachusetts. Possibly built as early as 1791, it is one of the oldest surviving district school buildings in the state. Now maintained by the local historical society, it was listed on the National Register of Historic Places in 2002.

== Description and history ==
The Northeast School is located in a rural setting of northern Richmond, on the west side of Summit Road just west of its junction with Swamp Road. It is a single-story wood-frame structure with a gabled roof. The main portion of the building measures 24.5 by 23.5 feet (7.5 m × 7.2 m), and there is an extension on the north end that measures 16 by 16.75 feet (4.88 m × 5.11 m). The basic construction is post and beam, and the building received significant restorative work in the late 19th century.

The exact construction date of the school is unclear, but is probably 1791. Town records indicate that a school building was standing near this road junction (known as Stevens Corners) in 1791, with no mention of earlier schools. No substantive repairs or reconstructions are recorded until 1802, when a stove was installed, and 1808, when additional repairs were ordered. The schoolhouse remained in use until 1937, when a new townwide school was opened. It was sold and used by farmer for storage and as a pighouse. In 1993 the Richmond Historical Society acquired the building, restored it, and moved it across the street to its present location. Of the town's six district schools built, it is the best preserved, and the only surviving one that has not been readapted for residential use.

== See also ==
- National Register of Historic Places listings in Berkshire County, Massachusetts
