= Simmons Block =

- U.S. National Register of Historic Places
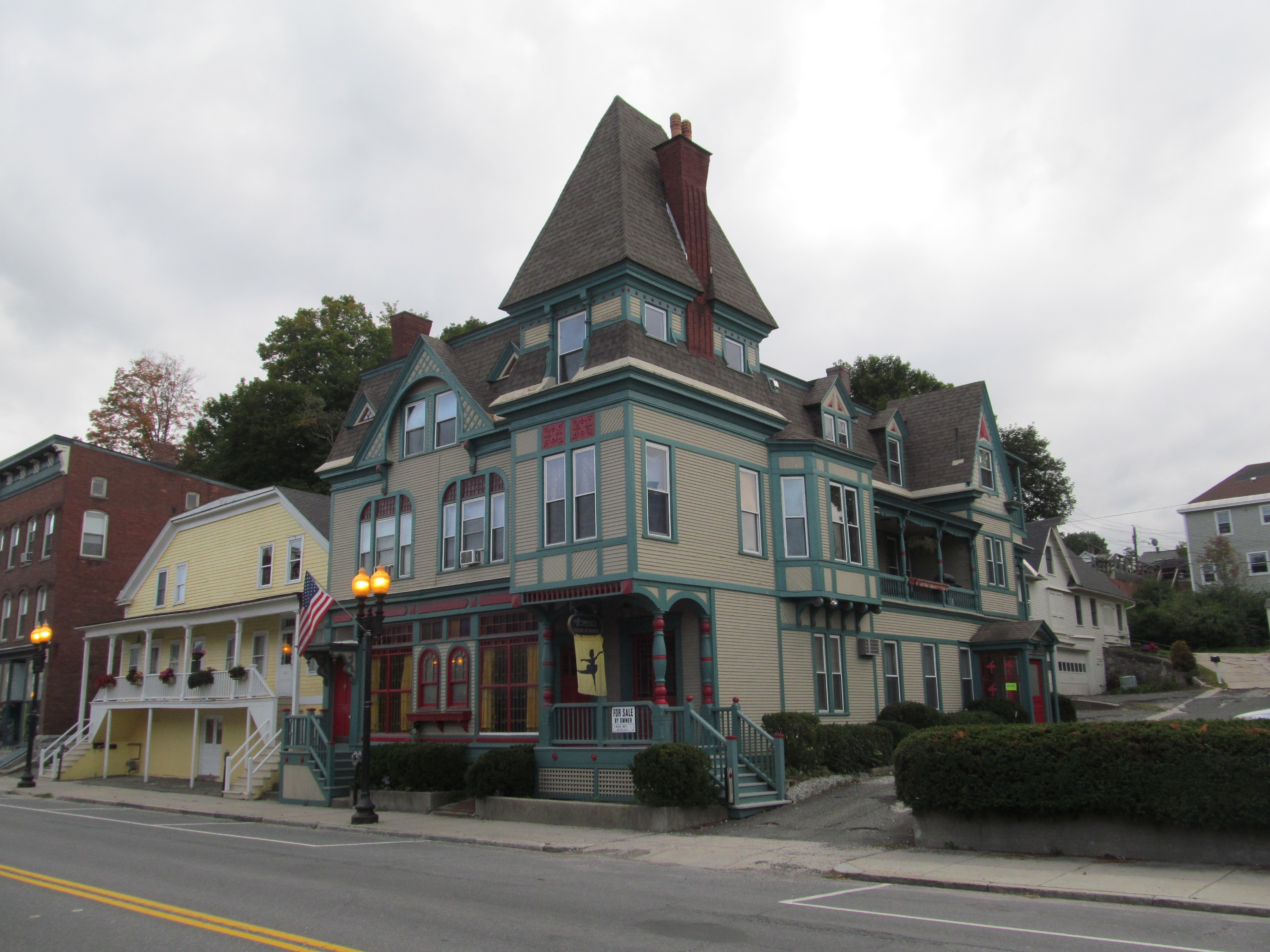
- 86 Park Street

- Location within Massachusetts Location within the United States
- Location: 86–90 Park St., Adams, Massachusetts
- Coordinates: 42°37′25″N 73°7′14″W
- Area: less than one acre
- Built: c. 1885
- Architectural style: Queen Anne
- NRHP reference No.: 82004951
- Added to NRHP: April 1, 1982

The Simmons Block is a historic commercial building in Adams, Massachusetts. Built about 1885, it is one of town's most elaborate examples of Queen Anne Victorian architecture. It was listed on the National Register of Historic Places in 1982.

== Description and history ==
The Simmons Block is located in downtown Adams, on the west side of Park Street just south of the Adams Free Library. It is a 2 1/2-story wood-frame structure, with a mostly clap boarded exterior. The structure features a variety of rooflines and a small tower in a typical Queen Anne style, with fine turned woodwork on the porches, and applied woodwork decoration. A square tower rises at the right corner, topped by a pyramidal roof. Entrances to separate parts of the building are located in a recessed porch in the base of the tower, and at the left end of the facade, sheltered by a bracketed hood. In between are a combination of plate glass display windows, with a projecting bay at the center that houses round-arch windows.

The building was built sometime between 1885 and 1889 for A.H. Simmons, a successful Adams businessman of the 1880s. Simmons is listed in early city directories as residing here, but the ground floor appears to have been designed from the start to house his funeral parlor as well. It is differentiated from other commercial construction of the period in Adams by its wood-frame construction, and it's particularly elaborate decorative elements. In the 20th century, the building has seen a variety of commercial uses, including as an apartment house.

== See also ==
- National Register of Historic Places listings in Berkshire County, Massachusetts
