= Normal School Historic District =

Historic district in Massachusetts, United States

- U.S. National Register of Historic Places
- U.S. Historic district
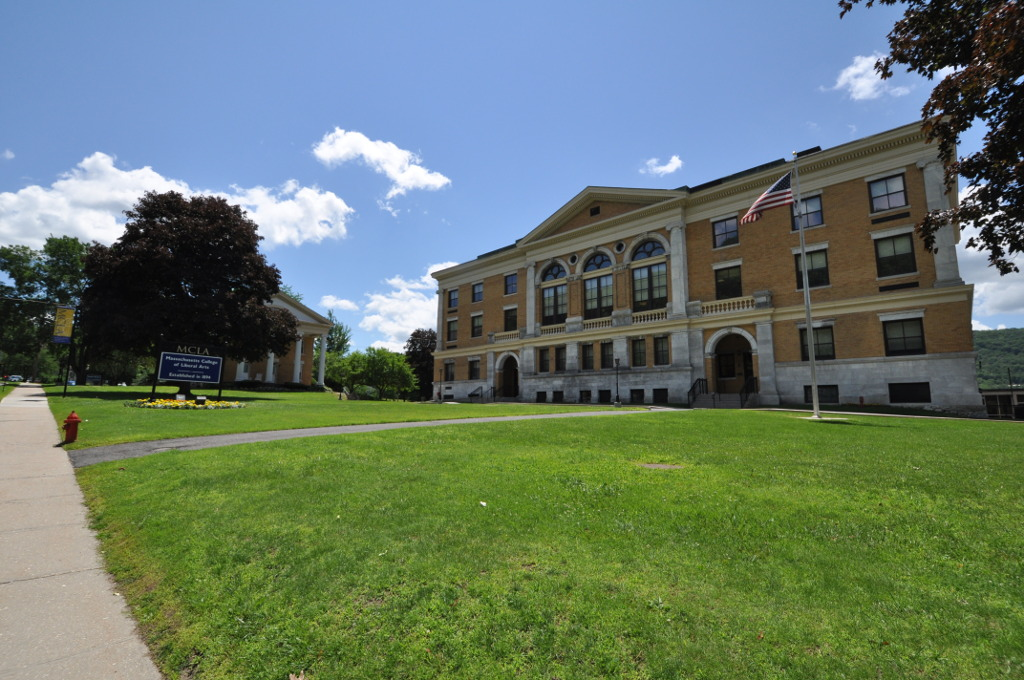
- Murdock Hall and Smith (President's) House

- Location within Massachusetts Location within the United States
- Location: North Adams, Massachusetts
- Coordinates: 42°41′27″N 73°6′10″W
- Architect: various
- Architectural style: Late 19th And 20th Century Revivals, Late Victorian
- MPS: North Adams MRA
- NRHP reference No.: 85003391
- Added to NRHP: October 25, 1985

The Normal School Historic District is a historic district in North Adams, Massachusetts. It consists of a group of ten buildings located along Church Street, roughly from Bradley Street in the south to Murdock Hall on the campus of the Massachusetts College of Liberal Arts (MCLA) in the north. The buildings represent a period of cohesive development of the area in the late 19th and early 20th centuries, shortly after the normal school (later North Adams State College, then MCLA) was established. It includes nine houses, eight of which are private residences, and one institutional building, Murdock Hall, dating to the inception of the normal school. The tenth building is Smith House, originally known as the Principal's House (later President's House), which is next door to Murdock Hall on the MCLA campus.

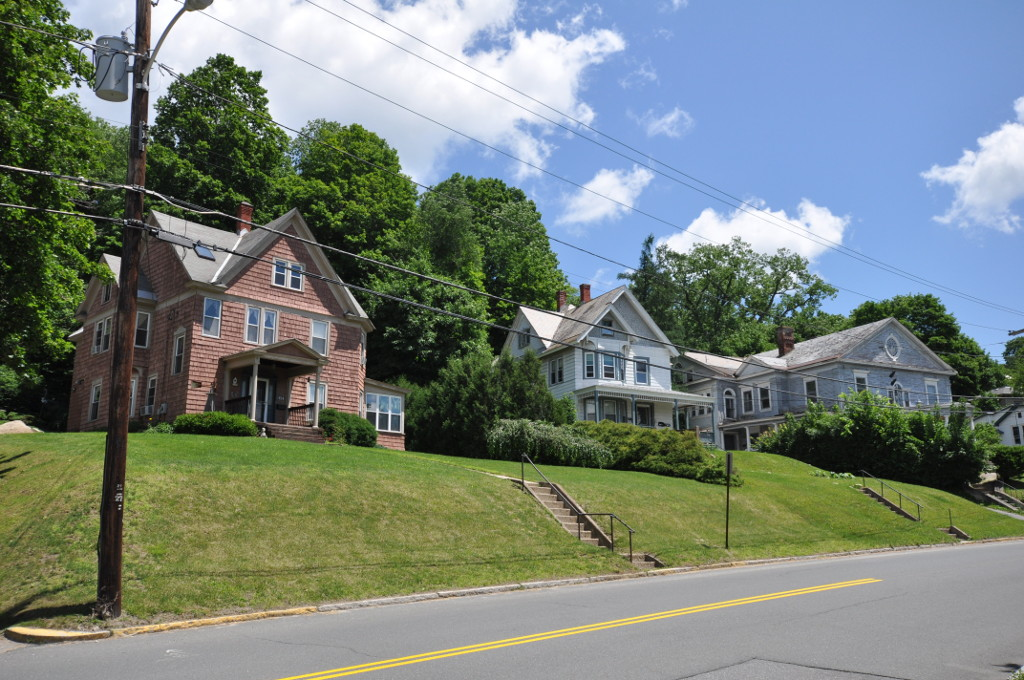
Houses on the north side of Church Street

All of the residential properties, including Smith House, are large Victorian houses. Six are in the Queen Anne style, with porches and turreted sections, while three are in the Colonial Revival style. Murdock Hall was built in 1896 (as was Smith House) and served as the normal school's main building. It is a rectangular Italianate structure built of yellow brick designed by architect H. Neill Wilson, and features a central pilaster-supported triangular pediment. Smith House is built of the same materials, but with Colonial Revival styling. A dormitory built at the same time has not survived.

South of Smith House on the west side of Church Street are three private residences, all built in either 1896 or 1897. The first of these, the Queen Anne style Hawkins House, was built according to a mail-order plan, and features some of the most elaborate woodwork in North Adams. The other five private residences are situated on the east side of Church Street; all but one was built in the early 1890s, before the normal school was established.

The district was listed on the National Register of Historic Places in 1985.

== See also ==
- National Register of Historic Places listings in Berkshire County, Massachusetts
