= Old Churchyard Cemetery =

Historic cemetery in Massachusetts, United States

- U.S. National Register of Historic Places
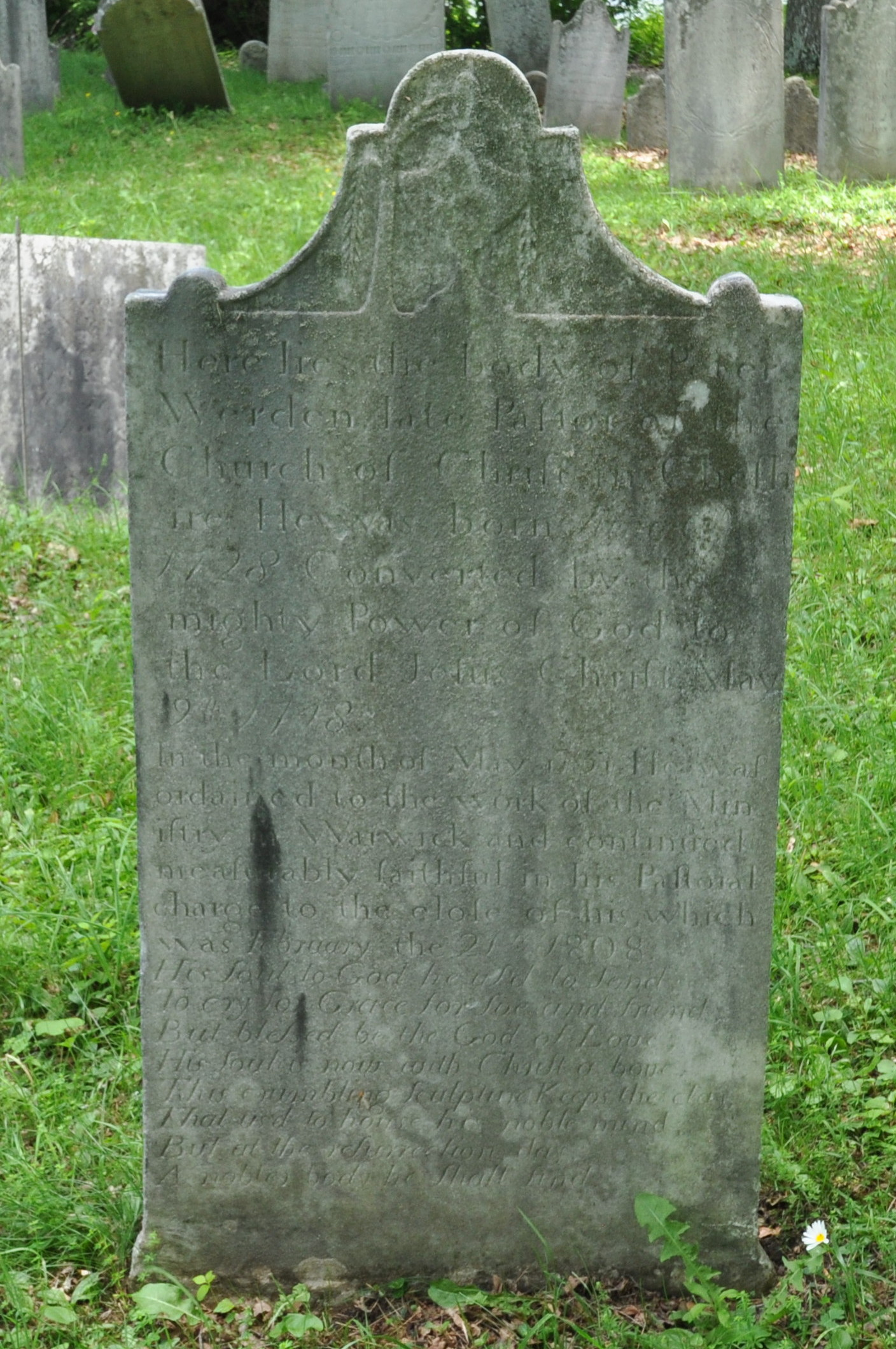

- Location within Massachusetts Location within the United States
- Location: Cheshire, Massachusetts
- Coordinates: 42°34′51″N 73°7′27″W
- Built: 1804
- NRHP reference No.: 12000206
- Added to NRHP: April 16, 2012

The Old Churchyard Cemetery (also known locally as the Stafford Hill Cemetery and the Jenks Road Cemetery) is a historic cemetery on Jenks Road in Cheshire. It is one of Cheshire's oldest cemeteries, and is located near the site of the first Baptist meetinghouse in the town.

== History ==
Cheshire, Massachusetts was settled as "New Providence" in the 1760s by a group of Baptists from Rhode Island. The main settlement was on what is now called Stafford Hill, in honor of Joab Stafford, one of the settlement's leaders. In 1786 a deed transferring the cemetery plot to Joab Stafford was recorded, "for a burying place" for the local Baptist church. This deed may have been a formalization of a situation existing since at least 1779. Although ownership of the land seems to have remained with the church, it was constructively abandoned by the mid-20th century, and acquired by the town in 2006. The property was the original site of the first Baptist meetinghouse in the area. That building was moved c. 1820 to a lot on Stafford Hill Road, and was repurposed as a house; it has been much altered since.

The cemetery is the burial site of many of Cheshire's earliest settlers, although it was not where Joab Stafford was buried. The names of 21 families are recorded on its gravestones, and three first settlers of the town are known to be interred there.

Most of the early gravestones are plain marble, without any significant decoration. The iconography of the willow and urn came into fashion during the early 19th century, and appears on stones that date to that time. A small number of stones show Greek Revival features. Unlike later cemeteries of the rural cemetery movement, this cemetery was never formally organized, with lanes and formalized rows of graves.

== See also ==
- National Register of Historic Places listings in Berkshire County, Massachusetts
