= H. W. Clark Biscuit Company =

- U.S. National Register of Historic Places
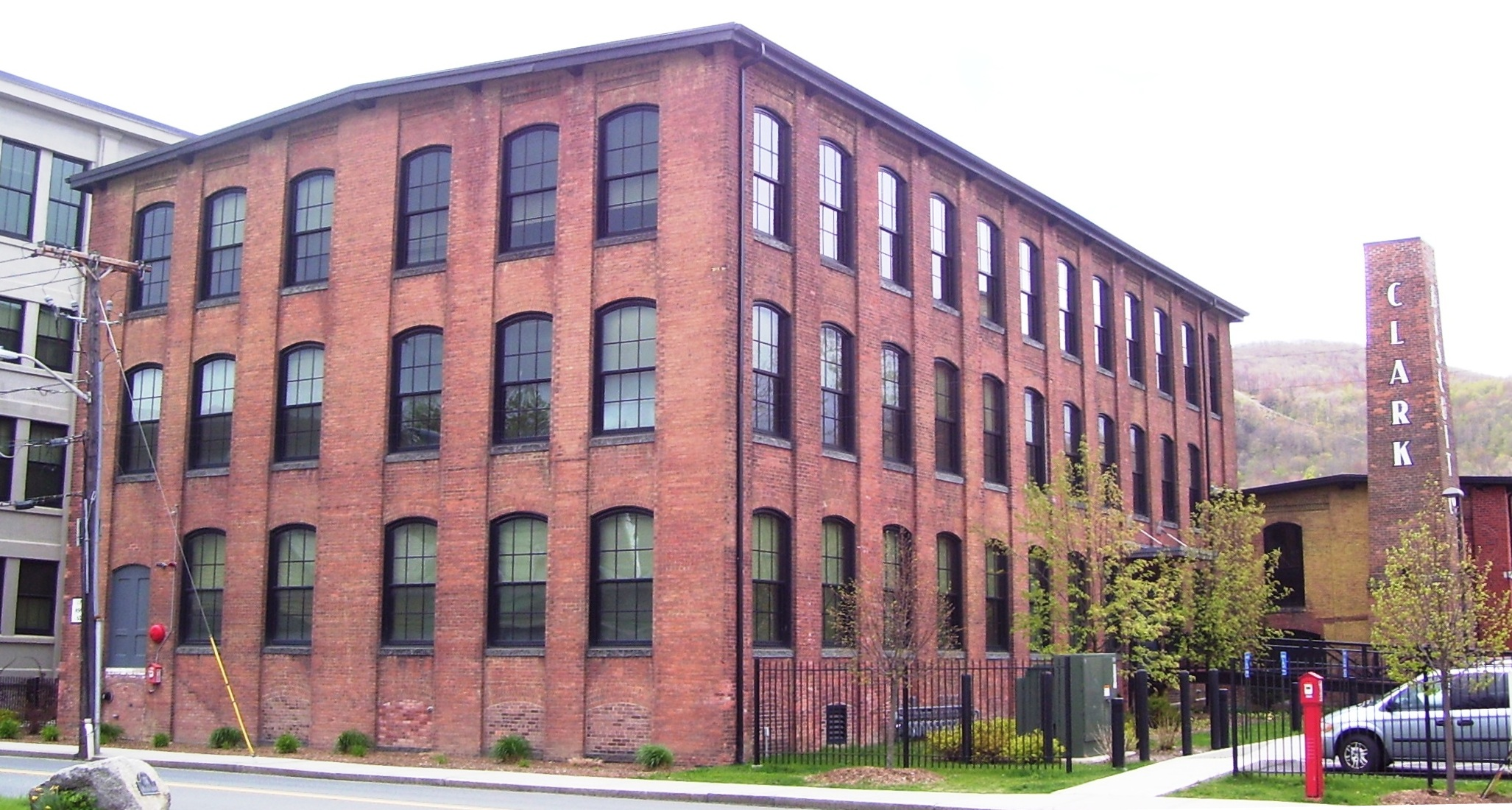
- The Icing Building, 2012

- Location within Massachusetts Location within the United States
- Location: 179–191 Ashland Street, North Adams, Massachusetts
- Coordinates: 42°41′39″N 73°06′33″W
- Built: 1923–30
- MPS: North Adams MRA
- NRHP reference No.: 09000235
- Added to NRHP: April 22, 2009

The H. W. Clark Biscuit Company is a former industrial complex in North Adams, Massachusetts. The bakery that Herbert W. Clark built at this site began at a facility on Liberty Street, and expanded into a shoe factory building (demolished in 1929) that Clark had operated with a partner. When the Liberty Street plant was destroyed by fire in 1913, Clark placed its employees on a second shift in the shoe factory building, and had the building now called the Icing Building constructed. This building was built in a style reminiscent of mills built in North Adams fifty years earlier, and is still sometimes thought to be an older building.

In addition to the Icing Building, Clark in 1913 built a Boiler House, which was attached to a warehouse formerly associated with the shoe business (and is the oldest surviving building on the property, dating to 1884). In 1922 Clark embarked on an ambitious modernization of the facility, constructing the Baking Building out of reinforced concrete to a design by New York architect William Higginson. It was the first reinforced concrete building in the city.

Clark sold the business in 1928 after his health began to fail. His successors operated the bakery until 1954. The buildings underwent a series of ownership changes, but were used for nearly forty years by the Tartan Machine Company. That business vacated the premises in 1990. After being vacant for two decades, the property was rehabilitated and converted to residential use.

The complex was added to the National Register of Historic Places in 2009.

== See also ==
- National Register of Historic Places listings in Berkshire County, Massachusetts
