= Philemon Sage House =

Historic house in Massachusetts, United States

- U.S. National Register of Historic Places
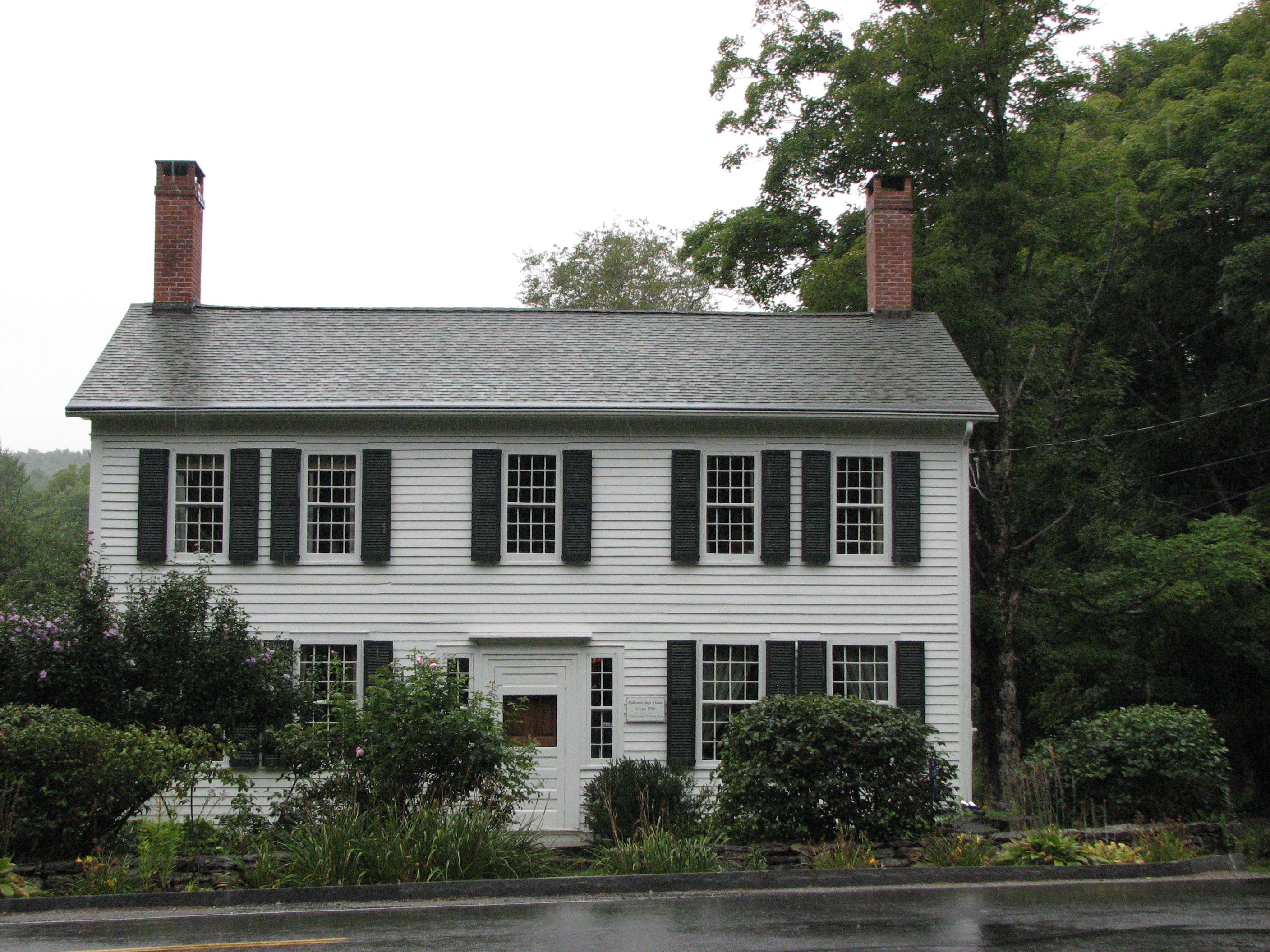

- Location within Massachusetts Location within the United States
- Location: 69 Sandy Brook Tpk., Sandisfield, Massachusetts
- Coordinates: 42°3′17″N 73°9′3″W
- Area: 40 acres (16 ha)
- Built: 1799
- Architect: Sage, Philemon
- Architectural style: Federal
- NRHP reference No.: 82001898
- Added to NRHP: August 31, 1982

The Philemon Sage House is a historic house at 69 Sandy Brook Turnpike (Massachusetts Route 183) in Sandisfield, Massachusetts. Built in 1799 and enlarged in 1827, it is a good local example of Federal period architecture. It was listed on the National Register of Historic Places in 1982.

== Description and history ==
The Philemon Sage House is located in a rural setting of southwestern Sandisfield, at the southwest corner of Sandy Brook Turnpike and Rood Hill Road. It is a 2 1/2-story wood-frame structure, with a five-bay facade, side-gable roof, twin chimneys on the center ridgeline, and clapboard siding. The front is symmetrical, with a center entrance flanked by sidelight windows and topped by a simple corniced entablature. A 1 1/2-story addition, the oldest portion of the house, juts from the rear of the house. The interior retains many original period features, including original doors and hardware, wainscoting, fireplace mantels, and flooring. The property includes foundational remains of a barn and an old tannery, which was located on Sandy Brook south of the house.

The ell of the house was built in 1799 by Philemon Sage, the son of Stephen Sage, one of Sandisfield's first settlers. Philemon Sage was a successful rural farmer, operating the tannery and a cheesemaking operation. He also served for a time as the town postmaster, operating the post office out of this house. The main block of the house he built in 1827 to house his large family. The house remained in his family until 1897.

== See also ==
- National Register of Historic Places listings in Berkshire County, Massachusetts
