= New Marlborough Village =

- U.S. National Register of Historic Places
- U.S. Historic district
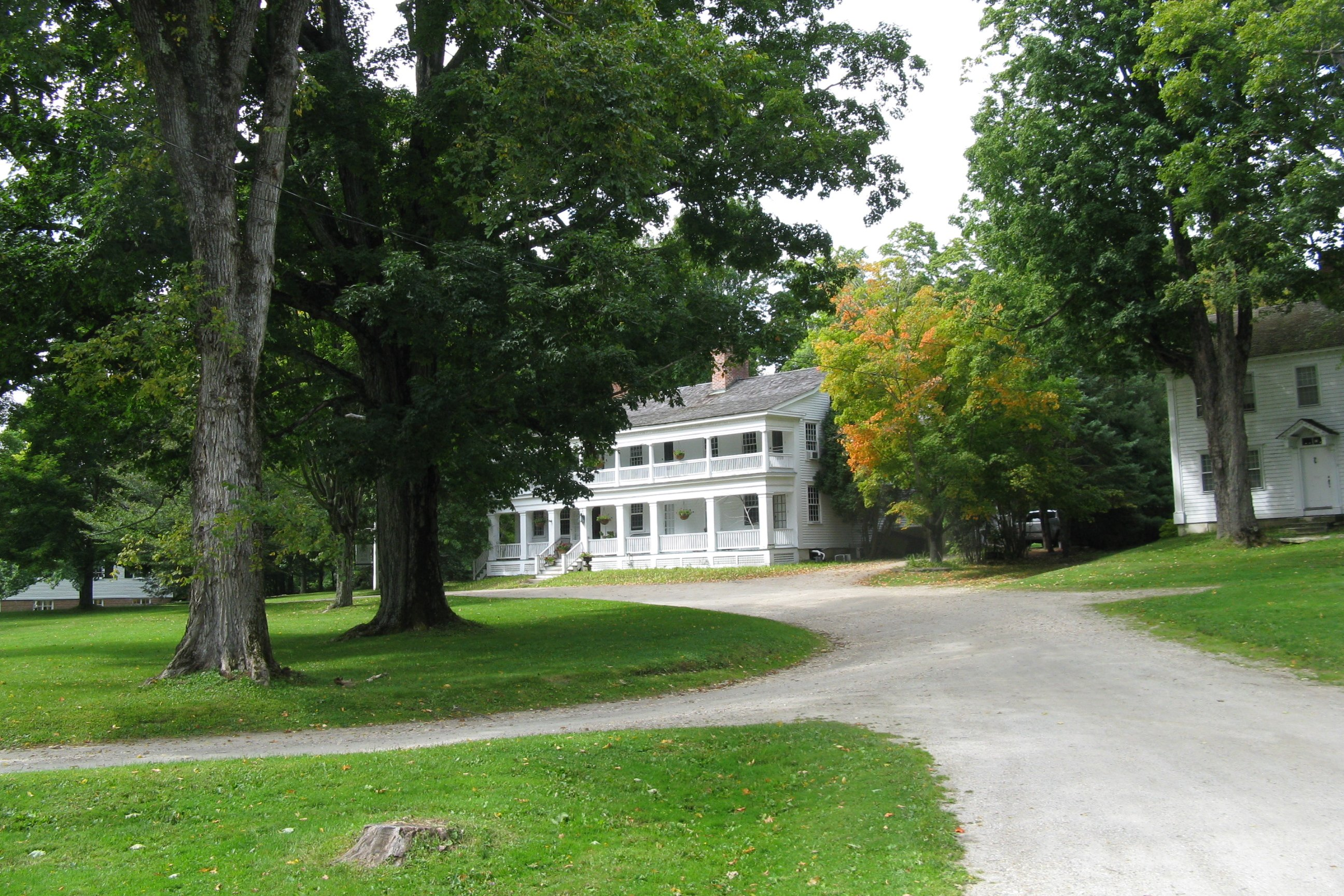
- The Old Inn on the Green

- Location within Massachusetts Location within the United States
- Location: MA 57 at Southfield Rd., New Marlborough, Massachusetts
- Coordinates: 42°7′30″N 73°13′38″W
- Area: 214.5 acres (86.8 ha)
- Architect: Multiple; Tattilow, Thomas
- Architectural style: Greek Revival, Federal
- NRHP reference No.: 82001896
- Added to NRHP: September 30, 1982

New Marlborough Village is a historic district encompassing the heart of the oldest village in New Marlborough, Massachusetts. It includes properties on Massachusetts Route 57, New Marlborough, Monterey and Southfield Roads. It was the town's civic heart through the late 19th century, and retains character from that period. The district was added to the National Register of Historic Places in 1982.

== Description and history ==
New Marlborough was settled in 1740 by Benjamin Wheeler, who built a house in what is now the village center area that still stands. The village center grew nearby his house, and now includes a village green, church, and a number of 18th and 19th century houses. The village declined in economic importance in the late 19th century, as it was supplanted by other villages in the town better sited for industrial activity.

The historic district is centered on the junction of Route 57 with Southfield Road, and extends onto Monterey and New Marlborough Branch Roads. The village green is located north of the junction, with the 1839 Congregational church and the historic tavern on the north side. The district also includes some industrial remains, including those of an 1830s foundry, one of the few instances of industrial activity in the village. Several of the houses are fine examples of Greek Revival architecture. The town's first cemetery is located at the western end of the village, and just to the north of the church are the foundational remains of a short-lived academy, which operated from 1855 to 1885.

== See also ==
- National Register of Historic Places listings in Berkshire County, Massachusetts
