= National Register of Historic Places listings in Berkshire County, Massachusetts =

Location of Berkshire County in Massachusetts

Berkshire County, Massachusetts, United States, has 181 properties and districts listed on the National Register of Historic Places, including 10 National Historic Landmarks. Latitude and longitude coordinates are provided for many National Register properties and districts; these locations may be seen together in a map.

Contents: Counties in Massachusetts

Barnstable | Berkshire | Bristol | Dukes | Essex | Franklin | Hampden | Hampshire | Middlesex | Nantucket | Norfolk | Plymouth | Suffolk | Worcester

This National Park Service list is complete through NPS recent listings posted November 13, 2026.

== Current listings ==
	Name on the Register	Image	Date listed	Location	City or town	Description
1	Allen Hotel	Allen Hotel	September 1, 1983 (#83000566)	Wendell Ave. 42°26′55″N 73°15′09″W	Pittsfield	
2	William Russell Allen House	William Russell Allen House	May 7, 1980 (#80000427)	359 East St. 42°26′52″N 73°14′49″W	Pittsfield	
3	Anthony House	Anthony House	January 3, 1985 (#85000021)	67 East Rd. 42°36′55″N 73°06′10″W	Adams	Birthplace of suffragette Susan B. Anthony Birthplace Museum; now a historic house museum.
4	Armory Block	Armory Block	April 1, 1982 (#82004944)	39-45 Park St. 42°37′20″N 73°07′14″W	Adams	
5	Armstrong House	Armstrong House	October 25, 1985 (#85003394)	60 Brooklyn St. 42°42′26″N 73°06′47″W	North Adams	part of the North Adams Multiple Resource Area (MRA)
6	Arnold Print Works	Arnold Print Works	October 25, 1985 (#85003379)	87 Marshall St. 42°42′05″N 73°06′59″W	North Adams	now the Massachusetts Museum of Contemporary Art (MASS MoCA); part of the North Adams MRA
7	Colonel John Ashley House	Colonel John Ashley House	February 10, 1975 (#75001915)	117 Cooper Hill Rd. 42°03′34″N 73°21′23″W	Sheffield	Historic house museum operated by The Trustees of Reservations. The 1773 Sheffield Declaration was drafted in the house. In 1781 Elizabeth "Mum Bett" Freeman won her freedom in a case which led to the end of slavery in Massachusetts
8	P. J. Barrett Block	P. J. Barrett Block	April 1, 1982 (#82004945)	70-76 Park St. 42°37′24″N 73°07′15″W	Adams	
9	Beaver Mill	Beaver Mill	May 11, 1973 (#73000292)	Beaver St. 42°42′12″N 73°05′55″W	North Adams	
10	Becket Center Historic District	Becket Center Historic District	August 11, 1982 (#82004952)	MA 8, Hamilton and YMCA Rds. 42°17′03″N 73°04′08″W	Becket	
11	Henry A. and Jennie Belden House		February 6, 2026 (#100012701)	180 West Street; 42°21′20″N 73°18′06″W	Lenox	
12	Berkshire Mill No. 1	Berkshire Mill No. 1	April 1, 1982 (#82004946)	Hoosac St. 42°37′31″N 73°07′06″W	Adams	
13	Berkshire Life Insurance Company Building	Berkshire Life Insurance Company Building	February 27, 1986 (#86000276)	5-7 North St. 42°26′56″N 73°15′18″W	Pittsfield	
14	Rev. Adonijah Bidwell House	Rev. Adonijah Bidwell House	August 26, 1982 (#82004954)	Royal Hemlocks and Art School Rds. 42°12′27″N 73°13′09″W	Monterey	
15	Blackinton Historic District	Blackinton Historic District	October 25, 1985 (#85003384)	Roughly Massachusetts Ave. between Ashton and Doanes Aves. and Church Hill and Boston & Maine RR; 42°42′13″N 73°09′50″W	North Adams	part of the North Adams MRA
16	The Boardman	The Boardman	October 25, 1985 (#85003403)	39-53 Montana St. 42°41′33″N 73°06′23″W	North Adams	part of the North Adams MRA
17	Boston Finishing Works	Boston Finishing Works	October 4, 2016 (#16000690)	160 Water St. 42°42′23″N 73°12′02″W	Williamstown	
18	Capt. John Brewer House	Capt. John Brewer House	March 29, 1984 (#84002083)	Main Rd. 42°10′40″N 73°12′29″W	Monterey	
19	Charles Browne House	Charles Browne House	October 25, 1985 (#85003413)	932 S. Church St. 42°40′43″N 73°05′52″W	North Adams	part of the North Adams MRA
20	Cheshire Town Hall Complex	Cheshire Town Hall Complex	March 7, 2017 (#100000719)	80-84 Church & 23 Depot Sts. 42°33′43″N 73°09′46″W	Cheshire	
21	Chesterwood	Chesterwood	October 15, 1966 (#66000652)	3 Williamsville Rd. 42°17′08″N 73°21′18″W	Stockbridge	Home of Daniel Chester French
22	Church on the Hill	Church on the Hill	September 30, 1982 (#82001894)	169 Main St. 42°21′49″N 73°17′01″W	Lenox	
23	Church Street-Cady Hill Historic District	Church Street-Cady Hill Historic District	March 10, 1983 (#83000567)	Roughly E. Main St. from Church to Pleasant St., and Church St. from Summer St. to Elmwood Ave.; also roughly bounded by E. Main and Holbrook Sts., Wall and Meadow Sts., Elmwood Ave., and Perry, South, and Ashland Sts. 42°41′48″N 73°06′26″W	North Adams	Listed on the National Register as "Church Street Historic District" but renamed and expanded on October 25, 1985; second set of boundaries represents the increase
24	Citizens Hall	Citizens Hall	June 19, 1972 (#72000126)	13 Willard Hill Rd. 42°18′58″N 73°19′52″W	Interlaken	
25	H. W. Clark Biscuit Company	H. W. Clark Biscuit Company	April 22, 2009 (#09000235)	179-191 Ashland St. 42°41′38″N 73°06′32″W	North Adams	part of the North Adams MRA
26	Clark-Eames House	Clark-Eames House	September 12, 1986 (#86002139)	230 Middlefield Rd. 42°20′36″N 73°04′31″W	Washington	part of the Washington MRA
27	Clinton African Methodist Episcopal Zion Church	Clinton African Methodist Episcopal Zion Church	May 29, 2008 (#08000464)	9 Elm Ct. 42°11′48″N 73°21′46″W	Great Barrington	
28	Coleman Bridge	Coleman Bridge	February 18, 2000 (#00000112)	Windsor Bush Rd. over Phelps Brook; 42°31′56″N 72°59′36″W	Windsor	
29	Congregational Church of West Stockbridge	Congregational Church of West Stockbridge	July 30, 1996 (#96000899)	45 Main St. 42°19′57″N 73°22′01″W	West Stockbridge	
30	Crane and Company	Crane and Company	July 1, 1983 (#83004376)	Off Main St. 42°28′10″N 73°10′42″W	Dalton	Listing encompasses what is now the Crane Company museum.
31	Cranesville Historic District	Cranesville Historic District	November 9, 2005 (#05001208)	North and south of Main St., west of Park Ave. 42°28′21″N 73°10′38″W	Dalton	
32	Crowley House	Crowley House	October 25, 1985 (#85003414)	365 W. Main St. 42°41′59″N 73°07′40″W	North Adams	part of the North Adams MRA
33	Dalton Grange Hall No. 23	Dalton Grange Hall No. 23	November 10, 1983 (#83003924)	South St. and Grange Hall Rd. 42°27′38″N 73°10′58″W	Dalton	Demolished.
34	W.E.B. Du Bois Boyhood Homesite	W.E.B. Du Bois Boyhood Homesite	May 11, 1976 (#76000947)	MA 23; 42°10′42″N 73°23′30″W	Great Barrington	Site of house where W.E.B. Du Bois, African American intellectual and activist, grew up.
35	Dwight–Henderson House	Dwight–Henderson House	March 26, 1976 (#76000237)	Main St. 42°11′29″N 73°21′56″W	Great Barrington	Home of colonial militia general Joseph Dwight.
36	Philip Eames House	Philip Eames House	September 12, 1986 (#86002140)	88 Stone House Rd. 42°22′18″N 73°07′09″W	Washington	part of the Washington MRA
37	East Lawn Cemetery and Sherman Burbank Memorial Chapel	East Lawn Cemetery and Sherman Burbank Memorial Chapel	September 14, 2000 (#00001086)	605 Main St. 42°42′27″N 73°11′47″W	Williamstown	
38	East Main Street Cemetery	East Main Street Cemetery	June 2, 2000 (#00000567)	E. Main St. 42°28′24″N 73°09′05″W	Dalton	
39	East Otis Schoolhouse	East Otis Schoolhouse	May 27, 2021 (#100006595)	2 Old Blandford Rd. 42°10′19″N 73°02′02″W	Otis	
40	Eaton, Crane & Pike Company Factory	Eaton, Crane & Pike Company Factory	August 3, 1990 (#90001166)	75 S. Church St. 42°26′47″N 73°15′38″W	Pittsfield	
41	Elm Court	Elm Court	December 30, 1985 (#85003184)	Stockbridge St. 42°20′19″N 73°17′31″W	Lenox and Stockbridge	
42	Elm–Maple–South Streets Historic District	Elm–Maple–South Streets Historic District	September 8, 2004 (#04000932)	2 Depot St., 2-14 Elm St., 1-2 Laurel Ln., 1-4 Maple St., 1-11 South St. 42°16′46″N 73°18′47″W	Stockbridge	
43	Fairview Cemetery	Fairview Cemetery	May 11, 2000 (#00000483)	Curtis Ave. 42°28′37″N 73°10′21″W	Dalton	
44	Farnams Village Historic District	Farnams Village Historic District	April 27, 2000 (#99000866)	Farnams Rd., Lanesborough Rd., and Cheshire Rd. 42°32′44″N 73°11′31″W	Cheshire	
45	General John and Mary Fellows Farmstead	General John and Mary Fellows Farmstead	August 28, 2018 (#100002828)	1601 Barnum St. 42°03′40″N 73°23′58″W	Sheffield	
46	Fitch–Hoose House	Fitch–Hoose House	June 24, 2010 (#10000390)	6 Gulf Rd. 42°28′52″N 73°10′32″W	Dalton	
47	Five Corners Historic District	Five Corners Historic District	January 7, 1993 (#92001717)	Junction of Cold Spring, Green River, New Ashford, Hancock, and Sloan Rds., and the surrounding area 42°39′35″N 73°14′33″W	Williamstown	
48	Freeman's Grove Historic District	Freeman's Grove Historic District	October 25, 1985 (#85003388)	Roughly bounded by Liberty St., Eagle St., Bracewell Ave., and Houghton St. 42°42′14″N 73°06′39″W	North Adams	part of the North Adams MRA
49	Freight Yard Historic District	Freight Yard Historic District	June 13, 1972 (#72000131)	West of the Hadley Overpass and southwest of the Hoosac River; 42°41′18″N 73°06′54″W	North Adams	Part of the Western Gateway Heritage State Park
50	Frelinghuysen Morris House and Studio	Frelinghuysen Morris House and Studio	May 31, 2016 (#16000304)	92 Hawthorne St. and 159 West St. 42°20′56″N 73°17′59″W	Stockbridge	
51	Glendale Power House	Glendale Power House	June 24, 1982 (#82004957)	MA 183; 42°16′50″N 73°21′11″W	Stockbridge	
52	Golden Hill Bridge	Golden Hill Bridge	February 9, 1994 (#93001592)	Golden Hill Rd. over the Housatonic R. 42°19′18″N 73°14′33″W	Lee	
53	Goodwood	Goodwood	April 15, 1982 (#82004955)	311 Summit Rd. 42°23′49″N 73°21′22″W	Richmond	
54	Hall's Tavern	Hall's Tavern	March 10, 1983 (#83000568)	31 North St. 42°33′46″N 73°09′58″W	Cheshire	
55	Hancock Shaker Village	Hancock Shaker Village	November 24, 1968 (#68000037)	5 mi (8.0 km) south of Pittsfield on U.S. Route 20, the Hancock Turnpike; 42°26′03″N 73°22′27″W	Hancock and Pittsfield	
56	Hancock Town Hall	Hancock Town Hall	September 26, 1975 (#73001956)	MA 43; 42°32′53″N 73°18′39″W	Hancock	
57	Samuel Harrison House	Samuel Harrison House	March 22, 2006 (#06000147)	80 Third St. 42°27′02″N 73°14′46″W	Pittsfield	
58	Hathaway Tenement	Hathaway Tenement	October 25, 1985 (#85003415)	311-321 River St. 42°42′13″N 73°07′12″W	North Adams	part of the North Adams MRA
59	Hillside Cemetery	Hillside Cemetery	July 19, 2001 (#01000722)	West Main St. 42°42′00″N 73°07′24″W	North Adams	part of the North Adams MRA
60	Home Farm Historic District		September 24, 2026 (#100013428)	385-400 Under Mountain Road; 42°22′25″N 73°17′56″W	Lenox	
61	Hoosac Street School	Hoosac Street School	February 10, 1988 (#87002547)	20 Hoosac St. 42°37′31″N 73°06′53″W	Adams	
62	Hoosac Tunnel	Hoosac Tunnel	November 2, 1973 (#73000294)	From North Adams on the west to the Deerfield River on the east 42°40′30″N 73°02′43″W	North Adams	
63	Housatonic Congregational Church	Housatonic Congregational Church	April 18, 2002 (#02000377)	1089 Main St. 42°15′29″N 73°21′56″W	Great Barrington	
64	Frank Howard Building	Frank Howard Building	August 14, 2012 (#12000499)	124-132 Fenn St., 67-71 Federal St. 42°26′59″N 73°15′07″W	Pittsfield	
65	Hyde House	Hyde House	November 21, 1976 (#76000239)	144 W. Park St. 42°18′13″N 73°15′12″W	Lee	
66	Hyde School	Hyde School	June 4, 2004 (#04000566)	100 High St. 42°18′24″N 73°14′53″W	Lee	
67	Jacob's Pillow Dance Festival	Jacob's Pillow Dance Festival	February 5, 2001 (#00001458)	George Carter Rd. 42°15′52″N 73°07′05″W	Becket	Declared a National Historic Landmark on May 27, 2003
68	Johnson Manufacturing Company	Johnson Manufacturing Company	October 25, 1985 (#85003418)	65 Brown St. 42°42′08″N 73°07′18″W	North Adams	part of the North Adams MRA; demolished in 2007.
69	Johnson School	Johnson School	October 25, 1985 (#85003416)	School St. 42°42′18″N 73°07′08″W	North Adams	part of the North Adams MRA
70	Jones Block	Jones Block	April 1, 1982 (#82004947)	49-53 Park St. 42°37′20″N 73°07′12″W	Adams	
71	Kenmore	Kenmore	March 28, 1996 (#96000326)	Junction of MA 41 and MA 295; 42°23′37″N 73°21′54″W	Richmond	
72	Lee Lower Main Street Historic District	Lee Lower Main Street Historic District	March 26, 1976 (#09000090)	Roughly the area surrounding Main and Park Sts. 42°18′17″N 73°14′56″W	Lee	
73	Lee Station	Lee Station	December 27, 2010 (#10001067)	109 Railroad St. 42°18′25″N 73°15′06″W	Lee	
74	Lenox Academy	Lenox Academy	September 30, 1982 (#82001895)	75 Main St. 42°21′32″N 73°17′05″W	Lenox	
75	Lenox High School	Lenox High School	August 25, 2004 (#04000903)	109 Housatonic St. 42°21′21″N 73°16′44″W	Lenox	Listing is for 1908 high school building, now apartments.
76	Lenox Library	Lenox Library	April 3, 1973 (#73000291)	18 Main St. 42°21′27″N 73°17′06″W	Lenox	
77	Lenox Railroad Station	Lenox Railroad Station	June 16, 1989 (#89000225)	Housatonic St. and Willow Creek Rd. 42°21′01″N 73°14′44″W	Lenox	
78	Lenox Village Historic District	Lenox Village Historic District	June 27, 2022 (#100006987)	Main, Church, Cliffwood, Franklin, Greenwood, High, Housatonic, Hubbard, Hynes, Kemble, Old Center, Tucker and Walker Sts.; Fairview and St. Ann's Ave.; Old Stockbridge and Ore Bed Rds..; Hillside Dr. 42°21′28″N 73°16′58″W	Lenox	
79	Lower Historic District	Lower Historic District	September 12, 1986 (#86002141)	Washington Mountain Rd. 42°20′24″N 73°07′04″W	Washington	part of the Washington MRA
80	Mahaiwe Block	Mahaiwe Block	September 12, 2008 (#08000898)	6-14 Castle St. and 314-322 Main St. 42°11′38″N 73°21′46″W	Great Barrington	
81	Main Street Cemetery	Main Street Cemetery	May 18, 2000 (#00000502)	Main St. 42°28′27″N 73°10′31″W	Dalton	
82	Main Street Historic District	Main Street Historic District	January 17, 2002 (#01001466)	1-57 Main St., 1-2 Pine St., 2 Sergeant St. 42°16′55″N 73°19′22″W	Stockbridge	
83	Maple Street Cemetery	Maple Street Cemetery	June 2, 2004 (#04000536)	Maple St. 42°37′35″N 73°07′29″W	Adams	
84	Mausert Block	Mausert Block	April 1, 1982 (#82004948)	19-27 Park St. 42°37′17″N 73°07′14″W	Adams	
85	Herman Melville House	Herman Melville House	October 15, 1966 (#66000126)	Holmes Rd. 42°24′56″N 73°15′04″W	Pittsfield	
86	Merrell Tavern	Merrell Tavern	February 23, 1972 (#72000136)	MA 102; 42°16′36″N 73°16′59″W	South Lee	
87	Methodist Episcopal Society of Tyringham	Methodist Episcopal Society of Tyringham	August 30, 2000 (#00000986)	128-130 Main Rd. 42°14′38″N 73°12′10″W	Tyringham	
88	Middlefield–Becket Stone Arch Railroad Bridge District	Middlefield–Becket Stone Arch Railroad Bridge District	April 11, 1980 (#80000502)	Middlefield vicinity 42°18′44″N 73°01′10″W	Becket	Extends into Chester and Middlefield.
89	Mill River Historic District	Mill River Historic District	May 17, 1994 (#94000423)	Roughly bounded by Main St. and River Church, Southfield, Clayton, School, and Hayes Hill Rds., Town of New Marlborough; 42°06′49″N 73°16′06″W	Mill River	
90	Mill Village Historic District	Mill Village Historic District	October 6, 1983 (#83003926)	Cole Ave., Mill, Arnold, and Elm Sts. 42°43′00″N 73°11′25″W	Williamstown	
91	Mission House	Mission House	November 24, 1968 (#68000038)	Main St. 42°17′00″N 73°18′57″W	Stockbridge	
92	Mohawk Trail	Mohawk Trail	April 3, 1973 (#73000283)	Along the bank of the Cold River; 42°38′15″N 72°57′13″W	Florida and Savoy	Extends into Charlemont in Franklin County
93	Montville Baptist Church	Montville Baptist Church	October 12, 2006 (#06000936)	5 Hammertown Rd. 42°07′07″N 73°07′30″W	Sandisfield	Now the Sandisfield Arts Center
94	Monument Mills	Monument Mills	November 29, 1983 (#83003927)	Park and Front Sts. 42°15′19″N 73°21′52″W	Great Barrington	
95	Monument Square–Eagle Street Historic District	Monument Square–Eagle Street Historic District	June 19, 1972 (#72000132)	Monument Square and environs, at the eastern end of Main St.; also roughly bounded by Holden, Center, and Union Sts., East Middle School, Summer, and Main Sts. 42°41′57″N 73°06′37″W	North Adams	Second set of boundaries represents a boundary increase of August 25, 1988
96	Morewood School	Morewood School	May 31, 1984 (#84002084)	30 S. Mountain Rd. 42°25′48″N 73°15′40″W	Pittsfield	
97	Mount Greylock Summit Historic District	Mount Greylock Summit Historic District	April 20, 1998 (#98000349)	Junction of Notch, Rockwell, and Summit Rds. 42°38′16″N 73°10′06″W	Adams	
98	The Mount	The Mount	November 11, 1971 (#71000900)	South of Lenox on U.S. Route 7; 42°19′53″N 73°16′54″W	Lenox	
99	Naumkeag	Naumkeag	November 3, 1975 (#75000264)	5 Prospect Hill Rd. 42°17′17″N 73°19′05″W	Stockbridge	
100	New Boston Inn	New Boston Inn	September 1, 1988 (#88001459)	Junction of MA 8 and MA 57; 42°05′38″N 73°04′40″W	Sandisfield	
101	New Boston Village Historic District	New Boston Village Historic District	April 8, 2022 (#100007554)	97-101 North Main and 79-110 South Main Sts. (MA 8), 2-4 Tolland (MA 57), 3-22 Sandisfield, (MA 57), and 2 River Rds., 4 Cannon Mountain and 3 & 5 Willow Lns. 42°05′38″N 73°04′37″W	Sandisfield	
102	New Marlborough Village	New Marlborough Village	September 30, 1982 (#82001896)	MA 57, New Marlborough, Monterey and Southfield Rds. 42°07′30″N 73°13′38″W	New Marlborough	
103	Nichols–Sterner House	Nichols–Sterner House	September 17, 1987 (#87001997)	428 Swamp Rd. 42°24′20″N 73°19′10″W	Richmond	
104	Norad Mill	Norad Mill	October 25, 1985 (#85003417)	60 Roberts Dr. 42°41′55″N 73°08′20″W	North Adams	part of the North Adams MRA
105	Normal School Historic District	Normal School Historic District	October 25, 1985 (#85003391)	Roughly Church and Blackinton Sts. 42°41′27″N 73°06′10″W	North Adams	Mostly Victorian residences near the Massachusetts College of Liberal Arts; part of the North Adams MRA
106	North Becket Village Historic District	North Becket Village Historic District	July 26, 1988 (#88000229)	Main, High, and Pleasant Sts. 42°19′57″N 73°04′58″W	Becket	
107	North Egremont Historic District	North Egremont Historic District	January 20, 1989 (#88003126)	Roughly bounded by Shun Toll Rd., Rt. 71, Hillsdale Rd., and Mill Rd. 42°11′55″N 73°26′25″W	Egremont	
108	Northeast School	Northeast School	August 30, 2002 (#02000902)	981 Summit Rd. 42°24′00″N 73°19′54″W	Richmond	
109	Old Central Fire Station	Old Central Fire Station	November 2, 1977 (#77000177)	66 Allen St. 42°26′58″N 73°15′09″W	Pittsfield	
110	Old Central High School	Old Central High School	August 6, 1980 (#80000428)	99 2nd St. 42°27′03″N 73°14′56″W	Pittsfield	
111	Old Churchyard Cemetery	Old Churchyard Cemetery	April 16, 2012 (#12000206)	Adjacent to 918 Jenks Rd. 42°34′51″N 73°07′27″W	Cheshire	
112	Old Covered Bridge	Old Covered Bridge	November 24, 1978 (#78000445)	Covered Bridge Lane; 42°07′26″N 73°21′17″W	Sheffield	
113	Old Curtisville Historic District	Old Curtisville Historic District	October 29, 1976 (#76000250)	North of Stockbridge on MA 183; 42°18′57″N 73°19′57″W	Stockbridge	
114	Old Town Hall	Old Town Hall	April 26, 1972 (#72001299)	32 East St. at the corner of Allen St. 42°26′54″N 73°15′11″W	Pittsfield	
115	Benjamin Osborn House	Benjamin Osborn House	October 1, 1987 (#87001758)	West St., east down abandoned lane 42°07′02″N 73°28′12″W	Mount Washington	Destroyed.
116	Otis Center Historic District	Otis Center Historic District	April 7, 2022 (#100007553)	11-29 East Otis, 12-41 Monterey, 14-144 North Main, 8-120 South Main, 25 & 37 Witter Rds. 42°11′35″N 73°05′31″W	Otis	
117	Park Square Historic District	Park Square Historic District	July 24, 1975 (#75001911)	At the junction of North, South, East, and West Sts.; also roughly bounded by E. Housatonic, South, North and Fenn Sts. and Wendell Ave. 42°26′54″N 73°15′12″W	Pittsfield	Second set of boundaries represents a boundary increase of December 23, 1991
118	Park Street Firehouse	Park Street Firehouse	January 28, 1982 (#82004949)	47 Park St. 42°37′20″N 73°07′12″W	Adams	
119	Pettibone Farm	Pettibone Farm	January 4, 1991 (#90001944)	Old Cheshire Rd., north of its junction with Nobodys Rd. 42°32′01″N 73°12′01″W	Lanesborough	
120	Phillips Woolen Mill	Phillips Woolen Mill	September 30, 1982 (#82001897)	71 Grove St. 42°36′23″N 73°08′05″W	Adams	
121	Pilgrim Memorial Church and Parish House	Pilgrim Memorial Church and Parish House	November 25, 2005 (#05001323)	249 Wahconah St. 42°27′56″N 73°15′14″W	Pittsfield	
122	Pittsfield & North Adams Passenger Station and Baggage & Express House	Pittsfield & North Adams Passenger Station and Baggage & Express House	April 1, 1982 (#82004950)	10 Pleasant St. 42°37′18″N 73°07′09″W	Adams	
123	Pittsfield Cemetery	Pittsfield Cemetery	March 13, 2007 (#07000145)	203 Wahconah St. 42°28′01″N 73°15′28″W	Pittsfield	
124	Charles Whittlesey Power House	Charles Whittlesey Power House	August 8, 1997 (#97000820)	575 South St. 42°25′44″N 73°15′21″W	Pittsfield	
125	Providence Court	Providence Court	November 20, 1987 (#87001107)	379 East St. 42°26′51″N 73°14′47″W	Pittsfield	
126	Quaker Meetinghouse	Quaker Meetinghouse	August 17, 1976 (#76000236)	Maple Street Cemetery; 42°37′38″N 73°07′34″W	Adams	
127	Ramsdell Public Library	Ramsdell Public Library	July 25, 2014 (#14000440)	1087 Main St. 42°15′29″N 73°21′55″W	Great Barrington	
128	Renfrew Mill No. 2	Renfrew Mill No. 2	October 14, 1982 (#82000474)	217 Columbia St. 42°38′15″N 73°06′26″W	Adams	
129	A.H. Rice Silk Mill	A.H. Rice Silk Mill	March 2, 2015 (#15000047)	55 Spring St. 42°27′24″N 73°14′30″W	Pittsfield	
130	Richmond Furnace Historical and Archeological District	Richmond Furnace Historical and Archeological District	August 31, 1999 (#99001044)	State, Cone Hill, and Furnace Rds. 42°21′21″N 73°22′32″W	Richmond	
131	Rising Paper Mill	Rising Paper Mill	August 11, 1975 (#75000253)	North of Great Barrington on MA 183 at Risingdale; 42°14′28″N 73°21′28″W	Great Barrington	
132	Rock Ridge	Rock Ridge	September 16, 1983 (#83000569)	Tyringham Rd. 42°11′08″N 73°13′19″W	Monterey	
133	Philemon Sage House	Philemon Sage House	August 31, 1982 (#82001898)	MA 183; 42°03′17″N 73°09′03″W	Sandisfield	
134	Saint Andrew's Chapel	Saint Andrew's Chapel	September 12, 1986 (#86002142)	Washington Mountain Rd. 42°21′27″N 73°07′58″W	Washington	part of the Washington MRA
135	St. Joseph's School	St. Joseph's School	December 22, 1983 (#83003928)	Eagle St. 42°42′04″N 73°06′33″W	North Adams	
136	St. Luke's Episcopal Church	St. Luke's Episcopal Church	February 23, 1972 (#72000127)	U.S. 7; 42°32′06″N 73°13′48″W	Lanesborough	
137	Searles Castle	Searles Castle	April 15, 1982 (#82004953)	Main St. 42°11′23″N 73°21′42″W	Great Barrington	
138	Shadow Brook Farm Historic District	Shadow Brook Farm Historic District	March 10, 1988 (#88000202)	Lenox West Rd., MA 183 near Bucks Ln. 42°20′41″N 73°19′38″W	Stockbridge	
139	Shaker Farm	Shaker Farm	November 6, 1995 (#95001198)	opposite 1448 Dublin Rd. 42°22′53″N 73°21′13″W	Richmond	
140	Sheffield Center Historic District	Sheffield Center Historic District	December 1, 1989 (#89002060)	Roughly US 7/Main St. from Miller Ave. to Salisbury Rd. 42°06′22″N 73°21′09″W	Sheffield	
141	Sheffield Plain Historic District	Sheffield Plain Historic District	June 23, 1988 (#88000881)	Roughly 0.5 miles (0.80 km) off U.S. Route 7, south from Cook Rd. 42°07′22″N 73°21′20″W	Sheffield	
142	Thomas Shepard House	Thomas Shepard House	May 31, 1984 (#84002085)	764 East Hill Rd. 42°05′21″N 73°12′02″W	New Marlborough	
143	Eber Sherman Farm	Eber Sherman Farm	October 6, 1983 (#83003929)	1010 State Rd. 42°42′03″N 73°10′10″W	North Adams	
144	William B. Sherman Farm	William B. Sherman Farm	October 25, 1985 (#85003419)	1072 State Rd. 42°42′03″N 73°10′24″W	North Adams	part of the North Adams MRA
145	Sibley–Corcoran House	Sibley–Corcoran House	September 12, 1986 (#86002143)	387 Valley Rd. 42°22′33″N 73°06′46″W	Washington	part of the Washington MRA
146	Simmons Block	Simmons Block	April 1, 1982 (#82004951)	86-90 Park St. 42°37′25″N 73°07′14″W	Adams	
147	Col. Benjamin Simond House	Col. Benjamin Simond House	September 1, 1983 (#83000570)	643 Simonds Rd. 42°43′47″N 73°12′20″W	Williamstown	
148	Society of the Congregational Church of Great Barrington	Society of the Congregational Church of Great Barrington	August 20, 1992 (#92000999)	241 and 251 Main St. 42°11′43″N 73°21′41″W	Great Barrington	
149	South Center School House	South Center School House	September 12, 1986 (#86002144)	Washington Mountain Rd. 42°21′00″N 73°07′33″W	Washington	part of the Washington MRA
150	South Egremont Village Historic District	South Egremont Village Historic District	May 31, 1984 (#84002086)	MA 23-41, Buttonball Lane, Sheffield, and Pinecrest Hill Rds. 42°09′28″N 73°24′38″W	South Egremont	
151	South Lee Historic District	South Lee Historic District	February 18, 1999 (#99000237)	1365-1710 Pleasant-1120-1140 Fairview St.-15-80 Willow St. 42°16′42″N 73°16′33″W	Lee	
152	South Mountain Concert Hall	South Mountain Concert Hall	August 14, 1973 (#73001943)	New South Mountain Rd. 42°25′14″N 73°15′52″W	Pittsfield	
153	Springside Park	Springside Park	June 27, 2008 (#08000553)	874 North St. 42°28′17″N 73°14′40″W	Pittsfield	
154	Stafford Hill Memorial	Stafford Hill Memorial	February 14, 1986 (#86000260)	Stafford Hill Rd. 42°34′28″N 73°06′59″W	Cheshire	
155	Stockbridge Casino	Stockbridge Casino	August 27, 1976 (#76000249)	E. Main St. at Yale Hill Rd. 42°16′56″N 73°18′06″W	Stockbridge	
156	Summer Street Historic District	Summer Street Historic District	September 5, 1985 (#85002009)	Crandall, Center, East, Liberty, Orchard and Summer Sts. 42°37′07″N 73°07′01″W	Adams	
157	Sykes House	Sykes House	October 25, 1985 (#85003420)	521 W. Main St. 42°41′56″N 73°07′59″W	North Adams	part of the North Adams MRA
158	Taconic and West Avenues Historic District	Taconic and West Avenues Historic District	June 11, 1998 (#98000680)	Roughly bounded by Main St., Maple, West, and Taconic Aves., and Castle St. 42°11′27″N 73°22′05″W	Great Barrington	
159	Trinity Episcopal Church	Trinity Episcopal Church	April 4, 1996 (#96000363)	102 Walker St. 42°21′16″N 73°16′56″W	Lenox	
160	Tyringham Cemetery	Tyringham Cemetery	September 16, 2009 (#09000716)	Church Rd. 42°14′34″N 73°12′05″W	Tyringham	
161	Tyringham Center School	Tyringham Center School	November 5, 2020 (#100005764)	2 Church Rd. 42°14′39″N 73°12′15″W	Tyringham	
162	Tyringham Library	Tyringham Library	January 11, 2018 (#100001960)	118 Main Rd. 42°14′45″N 73°12′15″W	Tyringham	
163	Tyringham Shaker Settlement Historic District	Tyringham Shaker Settlement Historic District	October 15, 1987 (#87001785)	Jerusalem Rd. 42°14′46″N 73°13′30″W	Tyringham	
164	Upper Historic District	Upper Historic District	September 2, 1987 (#86002145)	Roughly between Branch and Frost Rds. on Washington Mountain Rd. 42°21′48″N 73°08′37″W	Washington	part of the Washington MRA
165	Upper North Street Commercial District	Upper North Street Commercial District	December 27, 2002 (#02001615)	220-555 North St., 33 Eagle St. 42°27′14″N 73°15′09″W	Pittsfield	
166	US Post Office–Great Barrington Main	US Post Office–Great Barrington Main	January 10, 1986 (#86000163)	222 Main St. 42°11′47″N 73°21′40″W	Great Barrington	
167	US Post Office–Williamstown Main	US Post Office–Williamstown Main	July 17, 1986 (#86002243)	56 Spring St. 42°42′38″N 73°12′14″W	Williamstown	
168	Ventfort Hall	Ventfort Hall	March 5, 1993 (#93000055)	120 and 148 Walker St. and 55 Kemble St. 42°21′11″N 73°16′48″W	Lenox	
169	Villa Virginia	Villa Virginia	November 29, 1983 (#83003930)	Ice Glen Rd. 42°16′27″N 73°18′41″W	Stockbridge	
170	Wahconah Park	Wahconah Park	August 12, 2005 (#05000878)	143 Wahconah St. 42°27′45″N 73°15′05″W	Pittsfield	
171	Wells House	Wells House	October 25, 1985 (#85003393)	568 W. Main St. 42°41′54″N 73°08′05″W	North Adams	part of the North Adams MRA
172	West Stockbridge Grange No. 246	West Stockbridge Grange No. 246	February 5, 1999 (#99000134)	5 Swamp Rd. 42°20′09″N 73°22′07″W	West Stockbridge	
173	West Stockbridge Town Hall	West Stockbridge Town Hall	July 1, 2009 (#09000469)	9 Main St. 42°20′03″N 73°22′02″W	West Stockbridge	
174	Western Railroad Stone Arch Bridges and Chester Factory Village Depot	Western Railroad Stone Arch Bridges and Chester Factory Village Depot	January 13, 2021 (#100006273)	Vicinity of Herbert Cross Road, Middlefield/Becket Line (Bridges and Roadbed); 10 Prospect Street (Depot); 42°18′20″N 73°00′19″W	Becket	Extends into Chester and Middlefield; includes a subset of the Middlefield-Becket Stone Arch Railroad Bridge District.
175	Westover–Bacon–Potts Farm	Westover–Bacon–Potts Farm	July 27, 1990 (#90000157)	MA 41, south of its junction with MA 23; 42°08′53″N 73°25′01″W	Egremont	
176	Wheatleigh	Wheatleigh	April 6, 1982 (#82004956)	W. Hawthorne Rd. 42°20′27″N 73°18′14″W	Stockbridge	
177	Wheeler Family Farmstead	Wheeler Family Farmstead	September 6, 2011 (#11000614)	817 S. Main St. 42°10′43″N 73°21′46″W	Great Barrington	
178	White Terrace Apartments		August 24, 2026 (#100013317)	592-596 North Street, 2-8 White Terrace; 42°27′24″N 73°15′03″W	Pittsfield	
179	Williamstown Rail Yard and Station Historic District	Williamstown Rail Yard and Station Historic District	June 3, 1994 (#94000544)	Junction of Cole Ave. and N. Hoosac Rd. 42°43′11″N 73°11′25″W	Williamstown	
180	Windsor Print Works	Windsor Print Works	May 17, 1973 (#73000296)	121 Union St. 42°42′02″N 73°06′18″W	North Adams	
181	Wollison–Shipton Building	Wollison–Shipton Building	September 30, 1982 (#82001899)	142-156 North St. 42°27′02″N 73°15′12″W	Pittsfield	

== See also ==
- List of National Historic Landmarks in Massachusetts
- National Register of Historic Places listings in Massachusetts
