= A. H. Rice Silk Mill =

- U.S. National Register of Historic Places
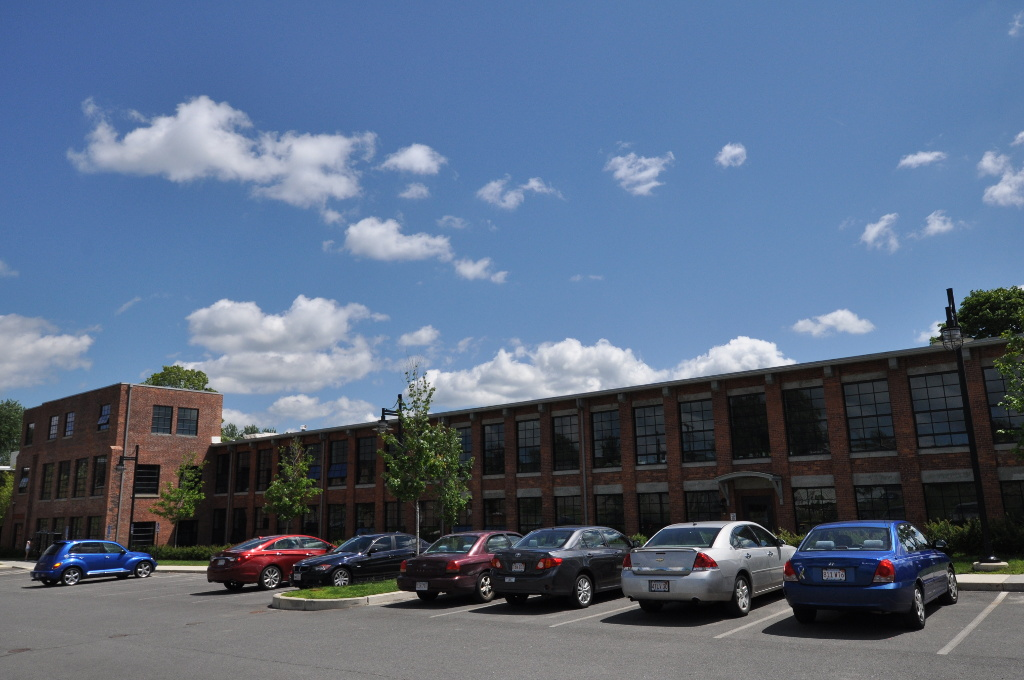

- Location within Massachusetts Location within the United States
- Location: 55 Spring St., Pittsfield, Massachusetts
- Coordinates: 42°27′24″N 73°14′30″W
- Area: 3 acres (1.2 ha)
- Built: 1874
- Architectural style: Late Victorian
- NRHP reference No.: 15000047
- Added to NRHP: March 2, 2015

The A. H. Rice Silk Mill is a historic textile mill in Pittsfield, Massachusetts. Built in 1876 to house a woolen mill, this multi-section brick building was purchased in 1887 by William Bainbridge Rice, who established his silk-processing operation here. The premises were expanded in 1895 after Rice acquired a New Jersey silkworks and moved its equipment here. The Rice Company was one of Pittsfield's largest business at the turn of the 20th century. It produced a number of highly specialized materials, including silk cords for parachutes, which they later also made out of nylon. The company was particularly known for its braided silk cord. The facilities were used in the production of silk cording until 2006. The property has since been converted residential use.

The mill complex is located northeast of downtown Pittsfield, in the city's Morningside residential neighborhood. It is on 3 acres (1.2 ha), bounded on the north by Burbank Street, the east by Spring Street, and the west by Cherry Street. It consists of five interconnected brick mill buildings, erected between 1876 and 1947, all of which are between two and three stories in height. All exemplify the use of an insurance standard fireproof design, with brick exterior walls, and heavy timber frames inside. Windows are typically set in segmented-arch openings with quarry-faced granite sills. As part of the residential conversion, some ground-floor window bays have been converted into entrances.

The mill was listed on the National Register of Historic Places in 2015.

== See also ==
- National Register of Historic Places listings in Berkshire County, Massachusetts
