= West Stockbridge Town Hall =

- U.S. National Register of Historic Places
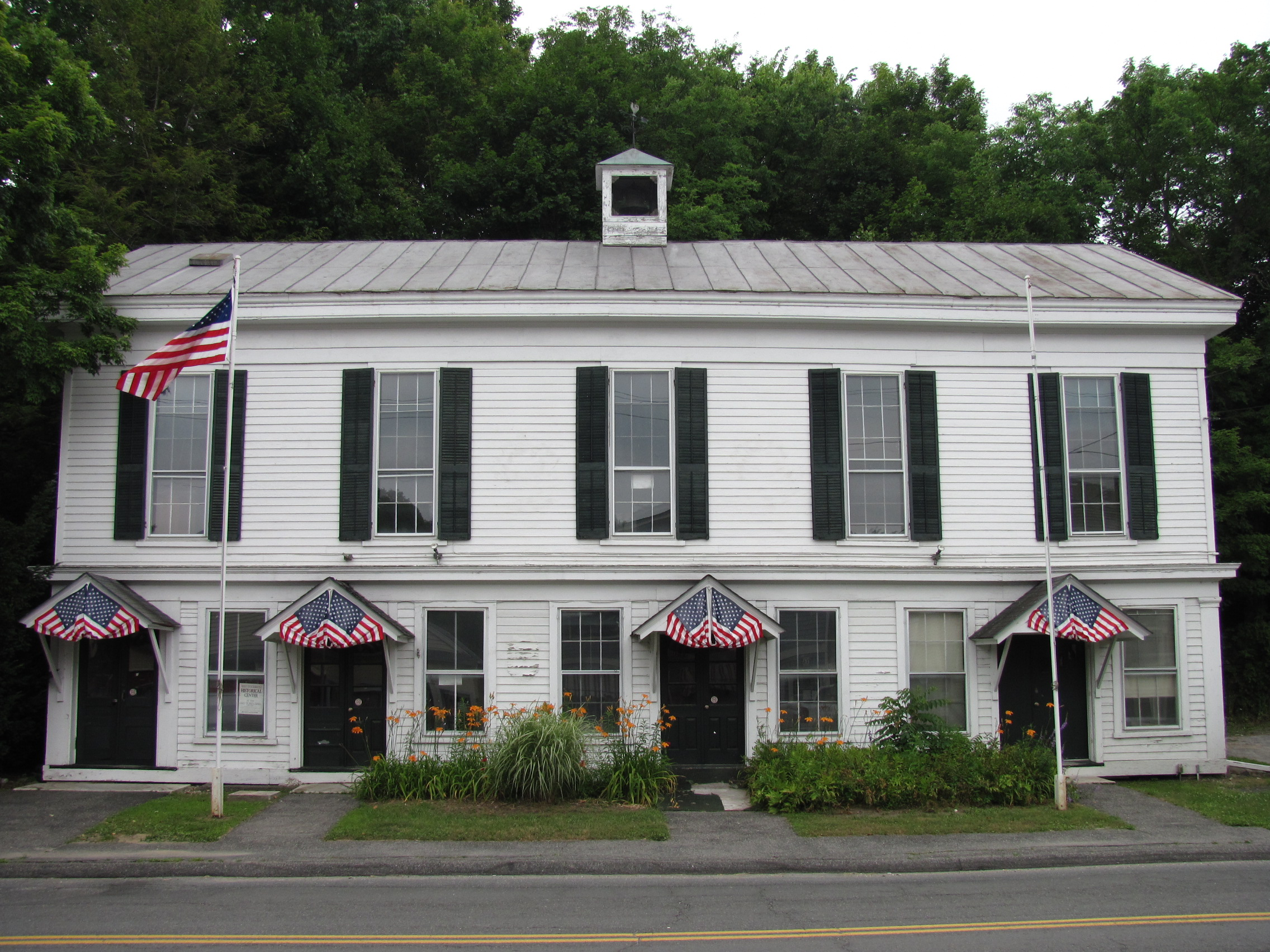

- Location within Massachusetts Location within the United States
- Location: West Stockbridge, Massachusetts
- Coordinates: 42°20′03″N 73°22′01″W
- NRHP reference No.: 09000469
- Added to NRHP: July 1, 2009

West Stockbridge Town Hall is the seat of government of the town of West Stockbridge, Massachusetts. It is located at 9 Main Street. The two story Greek Revival building was built in 1854, and has retained much of its original woodwork and integrity despite its use for a variety of civic purposes in the time since its construction. The hall was listed on the National Register of Historic Places in 2009.

== Description and history ==
West Stockbridge Town Hall is located in the village center of the town, on the east side of Main Street near its junction with Center Street. It is a 2-1/2 story wood frame building, with a gabled roof parallel to the street and a clapboarded exterior. The ground floor of the street-facing facade is organized into three storefronts, with an upstairs entrance at the far left end. Each storefront consists of a center entrance flanked by sash windows. All four doorways are sheltered by gabled hoods supported by large angle brackets. Pilasters rise at the building corners to a cornice separating the first and second floors. The second story has five large and evenly spaced sash windows.

One of the few prominent 20th century exterior alterations is the addition of a cupola in 1978 to house the bell of an 1878 schoolhouse. Although it was built with the idea that other businesses would also occupy parts of the building, the town has taken over the entire space, which now also includes the public library. The downstairs houses some town offices and the library, and the upstairs, which was originally a large open hall with a stage at one end, has been partitioned for further office space, although these changes are reversible.

== See also ==
- National Register of Historic Places listings in Berkshire County, Massachusetts
