= Richmond Furnace Historical and Archeological District =

Historic district in Massachusetts, United States

- U.S. National Register of Historic Places
- U.S. Historic district
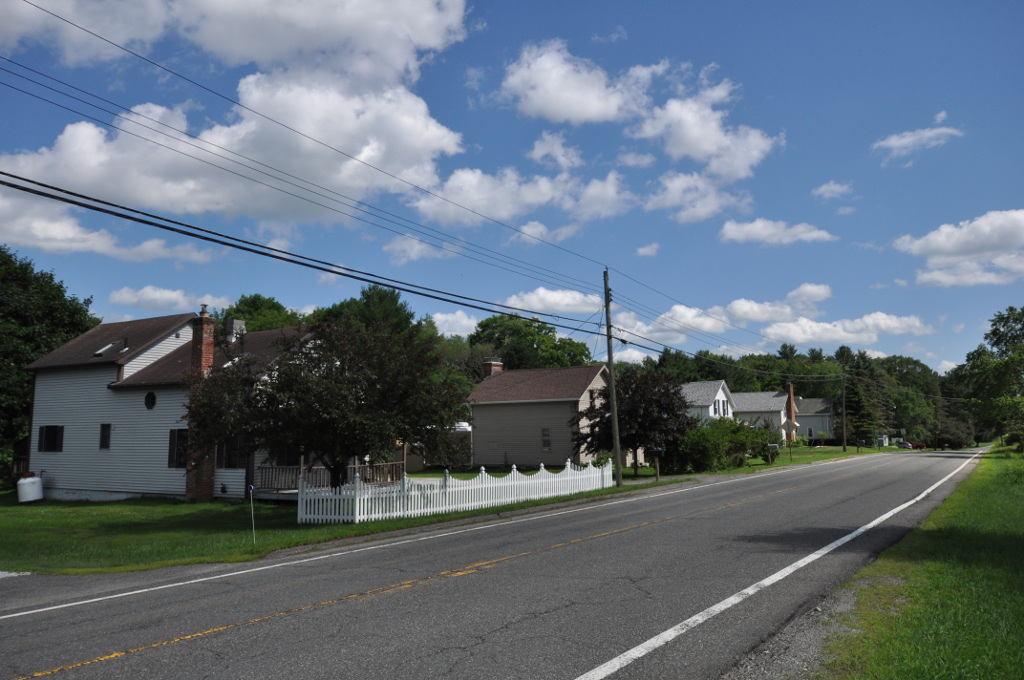
- A row of former worker housing on Route 41

- Location within Massachusetts Location within the United States
- Location: State, Cone Hill, and Furnace Rds., Richmond, Massachusetts
- Coordinates: 42°21′21″N 73°22′32″W
- Area: 290 acres (120 ha)
- Built: 1763
- Architect: Bartram, I.N., & Co.; Richmond Iron Works Co.
- Architectural style: Federal, Greek Revival
- NRHP reference No.: 99001044
- Added to NRHP: August 31, 1999

The Richmond Furnace Historical and Archeological District is a historic industrial area located on State, Cone Hill, and Furnace Roads in Richmond, Massachusetts. The industrial history of the site dates to 1763 when the first grist and sawmills were built. In 1829, the first stone furnace was constructed for the production of iron from abundant hematite ore found nearby. It was rebuilt in 1863, and overhauled in 1905 to increase capacity. The area saw industrial iron production until 1923. The historic district also includes several other houses and buildings related to the iron works. It was added to the National Register of Historic Places in 1999.

== Description ==
The Richmond Furnace district is located in southern Richmond, in an area that is now almost entirely rural in character. It covers an area about 290 acres (120 ha) in size, that is roughly L-shaped. The vertical part of the L is organized around Furnace Brook, which flows roughly south on the east side of Massachusetts Route 41. Industrial remnants are found mainly on the east side of the brook, between Furnace Pond (whose dam is crossed by Pilgrim Road) and areas south of Furnace Road. The main furnace is located on private land between Furnace Lane, now a short spur with a few houses on it, and the brook. The base of the L extends further east from this area, including a few more houses and industrial remains, the most prominent a water-filled quarry on the north side of Furnace Road. The eastern extent of the district is on Cone Hill Road, where some industry-related housing stands, as does the Cone Hill Cemetery, where individuals associated with the works are buried. Surviving elements of worker and management housing are found on most of the named roads, with a cluster located on Route 41 near Pilgrim Road.

== Site history ==
In 1829, brothers John H., Charles and George Coffing established the Richmond Iron Works on the site. The Coffings has previously worked at the Salisbury Iron Works in nearby Connecticut. In 1834, a second furnace, 32 feet high x 9.5 feet wide was built at Van Deusenville, in nearby Great Barrington. By 1855, the company used 9,000 tons of ore to produce 3,200 tons of iron.

The Van Deusenville furnace operated until 1896. It was dismantled in 1906. By 1908, the Richmond site had an annual capacity of 5,000 tons, and produced pig iron for car wheels and machinery. The main furnace was described at that time as measuring approximately 33 feet tall by 9.5 feet wide at its base.

== See also ==
- National Register of Historic Places listings in Berkshire County, Massachusetts
