= East Otis Schoolhouse =

- U.S. National Register of Historic Places
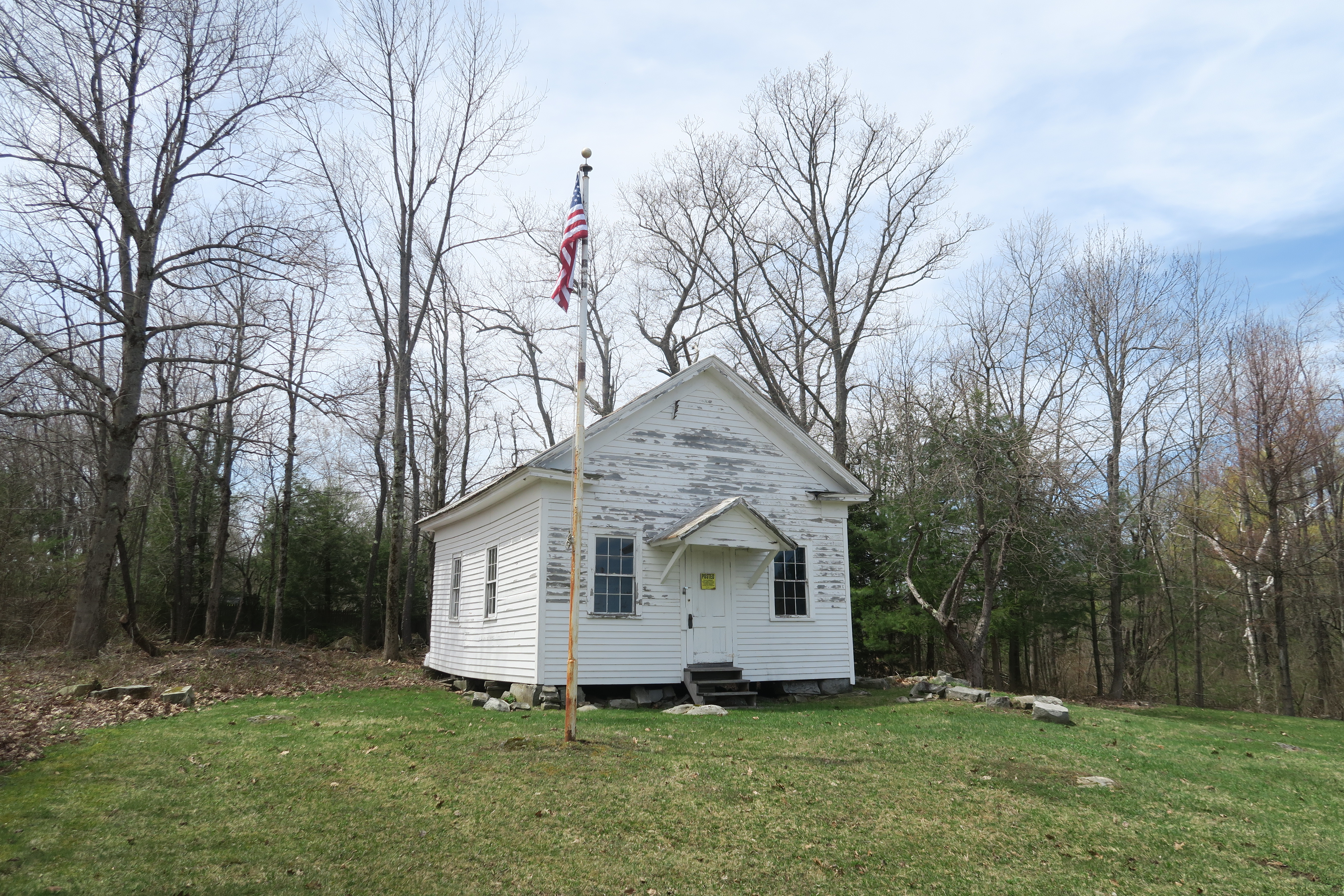

- Location within Massachusetts Location within the United States
- Location: 2 Old Blandford Rd., Otis, Massachusetts
- Coordinates: 42°18′28″N 73°14′54″W
- Built: c. 1856
- Architectural style: Greek Revival
- NRHP reference No.: 100006595
- Added to NRHP: May 27, 2021

The East Otis Schoolhouse is a historic school building at 2 Old Blandford Road in Otis, Massachusetts. Built before 1856, the one-room schoolhouse served the town until 1949, after which time it has sat largely vacant and unused. The building, a modest example of a Greek Revival district school, was listed on the National Register of Historic Places in 2021.

== Description and history ==
The East Otis Schoolhouse stands in the small rural village of East Otis, on a rise overlooking the junction of Old Blandford Road, Pike Street, and Massachusetts Route 23. It is a single-story wood frame structure, with a gabled metal roof and clapboarded exterior. The boxed eaves with plain frieze below are suggestive of the Greek Revival style. The main facade has a pair of sash windows flanking the main entrance, which is sheltered by a gabled hood.

The exact construction date of the building is not known; it is first documented to be standing on a map published in 1858. The land on which it stands was donated by local farmer Alden Soule, who also gave land for a church that stood next door. The school served the town as a district school house, generally with a multi-grade population of 15 or fewer students. It underwent a number of modest alterations as increasing standards for schools demanded, before it was finally closed in 1949 with the opening of the Otis Center School. Alterations include the addition of an enclosed privy area, and the removal of the building's chimney. It has stood vacant and largely unused since then.

== See also ==
- National Register of Historic Places listings in Berkshire County, Massachusetts
