= Sibley–Corcoran House =

Historic house in Massachusetts, United States

- U.S. National Register of Historic Places
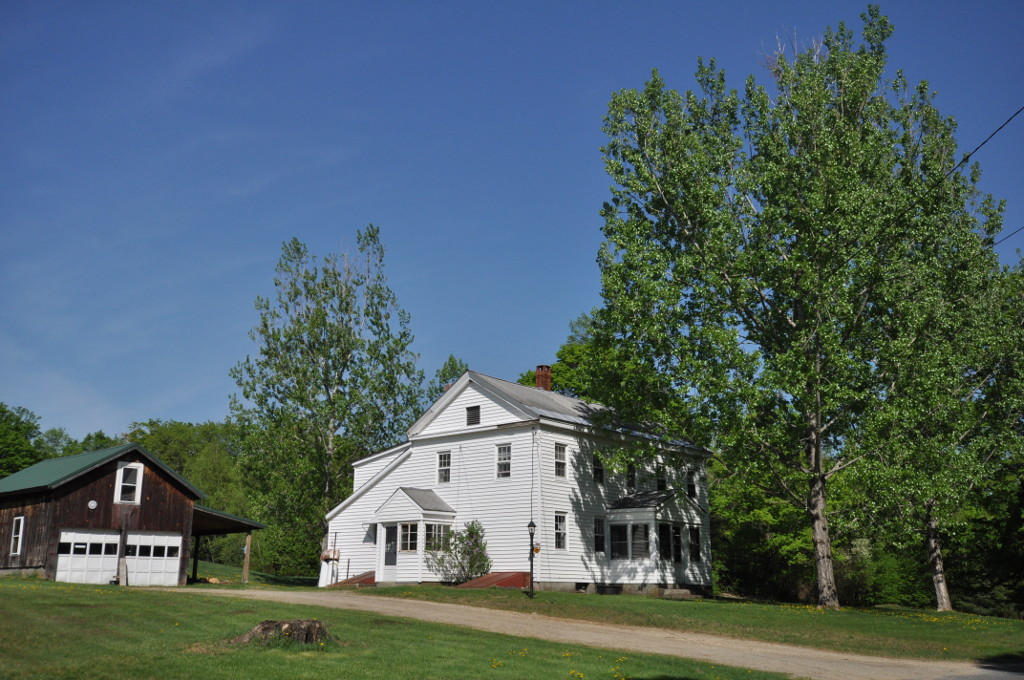

- Location within Massachusetts Location within the United States
- Location: 387 Upper Valley Rd., Washington, Massachusetts
- Coordinates: 42°22′32.6″N 73°6′45.5″W
- Area: 10 acres (4.0 ha)
- Built: 1813
- Architect: Ezra Sibley
- Architectural style: Greek Revival, Federal
- MPS: Washington MRA
- NRHP reference No.: 86002143
- Added to NRHP: September 12, 1986

The Sibley–Corcoran House is a historic house at 387 Upper Valley Road in Washington, Massachusetts. Built about 1813, it is a well-preserved example of a rural Federal style farmhouse, with later Greek Revival alterations. The house was listed on the National Register of Historic Places on September 12, 1986.

== Description and history ==
The Sibley–Corcoran House is located in eastern Washington, on about 10 acres (4.0 ha) at the northwest corner of Summit Hill and Upper Valley Roads. It is a 2 1/2-story wood-frame structure, with a gabled roof and central chimney. Its main facade is five bays wide, with its main entrance sheltered by a small enclosed gable-roofed vestibule. The exterior is clad in modern siding, either replacing or obscuring architecturally significant features. The side gables are fully pedimented, a Greek Revival alteration. The secondary entrance, on the south side of the house, also has an enclosed vestibule, and a shed-roofed addition extends to the rear. A 20th-century garage stands off to one side.

The house was built c. 1813 by Ezra Sibley, and sold in 1825 to Daniel Sibley, including 123 acres (50 ha) of land. Daniel Sibley was likely responsible for making the Greek Revival alterations to the house, which included the placement of broad cornerboards, as well as a frieze and entablature below the roof line. In 1869, the house was sold to John Corcoran, an employee of the railroad which passed near the house. The house represents a late entry in the town's development, which was stunted by the poor quality of its land, and came to an effective end in the late 1810s.

== See also ==
- National Register of Historic Places listings in Berkshire County, Massachusetts
