= Old Central Fire Station (Pittsfield, Massachusetts) =

- U.S. National Register of Historic Places
- U.S. Historic district – Contributing property
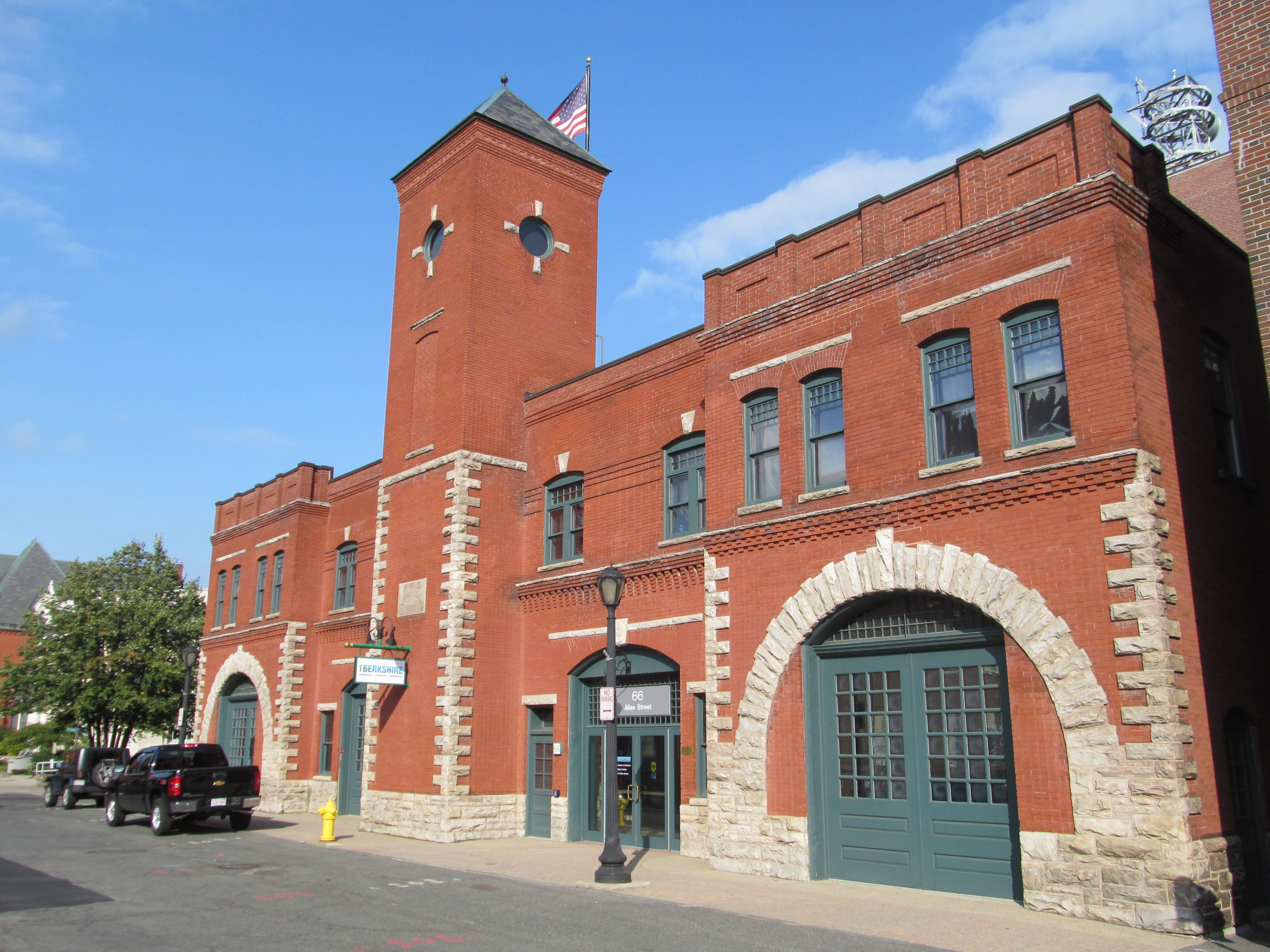

- Location within Massachusetts Location within the United States
- Location: 66 Allen St., Pittsfield, Massachusetts
- Coordinates: 42°26′58″N 73°15′9″W
- Area: less than one acre
- Built: 1895
- Architect: E.J. Cowell
- Architectural style: Queen Anne, Romanesque
- Part of: Park Square Historic District (ID91001826)
- NRHP reference No.: 77000177

Significant dates
- Added to NRHP: November 2, 1977
- Designated CP: December 23, 1991

The Old Central Fire Station is a historic fire station at 66 Allen Street in Pittsfield, Massachusetts. Built in 1895, it is the city's oldest surviving fire station, and a prominent local example of Romanesque architecture. The station was listed on the National Register of Historic Places in 1977, and was included in an expansion of Pittsfield's Park Square Historic District in 1991. It now houses offices.

== Description and history ==
Pittsfield's former Central Fire Station is located roughly behind the Old Town Hall in the city's downtown Park Square area. The building is constructed primarily of brick in a Richardsonian Romanesque style. It is two stories in height, with a 60-foot (18 m) hose drying tower at one corner. It has four equipment bays, the outer ones set in large round-arch surrounds, and the inner ones set in segmented-arch openings. It was the first city station equipped for the stabling of horses on its premises.

The station's general location has been used since about 1844 as a site for fire companies. A previous building, located across the street, was destroyed by fire in 1859. After construction of this building in 1895 the old building housed the Veteran Fireman's Association; it was demolished in the 1930s. This building was built in 1895 to a design by E.J. Cowell, the city's building inspector. Cowell had a reputation as a designer of local houses. The building was used as a fire station until 1976, and thereafter as a city vehicle storage facility. It now houses the offices of a local economic development agency.

== See also ==
- National Register of Historic Places listings in Berkshire County, Massachusetts
