= Louis Weissbein =

German-born American architect

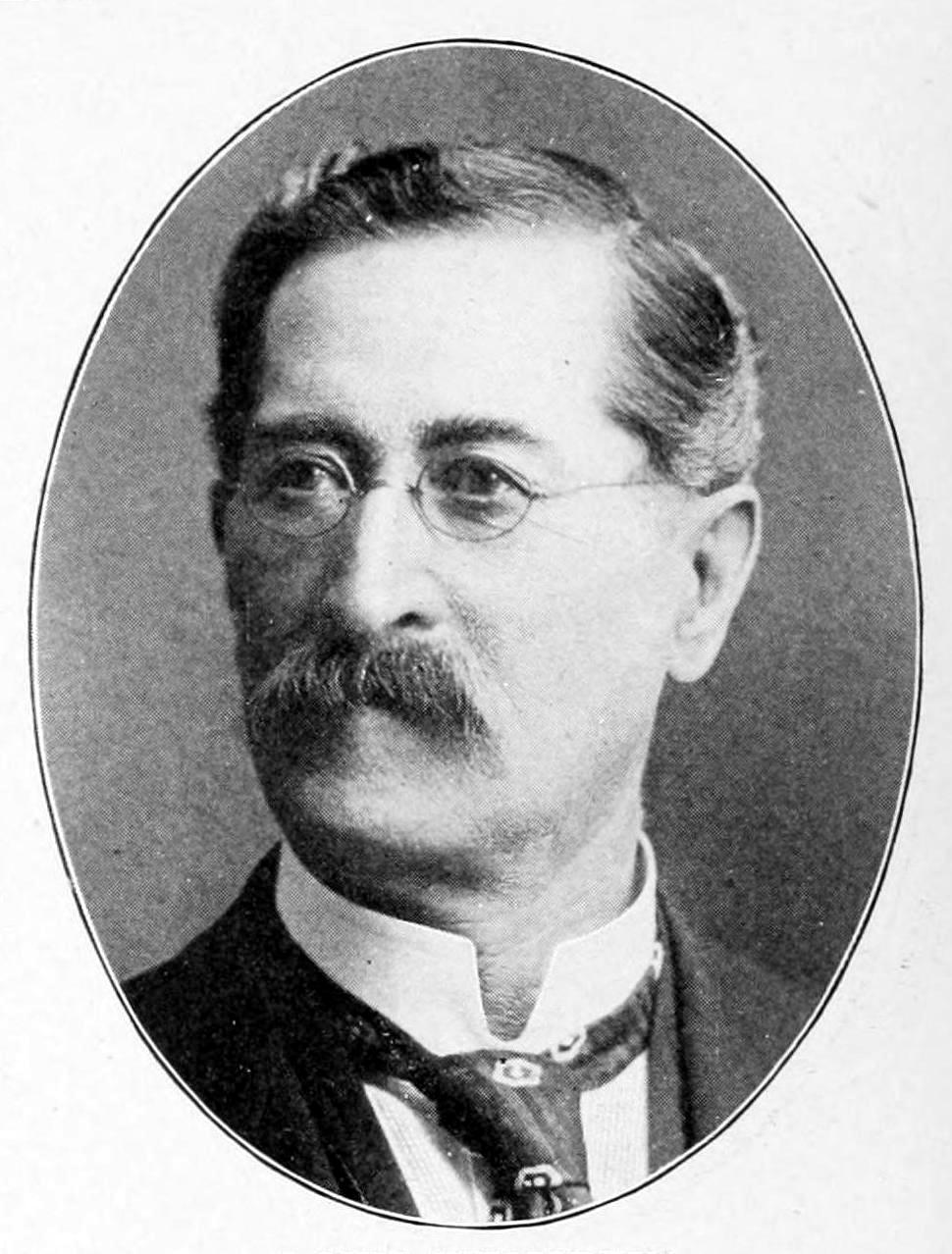
- Louis Weissbein, c. 1903
- Born: July 19, 1831; Krotoschin, Prussia
- Died: December 10, 1913 (aged 82); Boston, Massachusetts
- Occupation: Architect

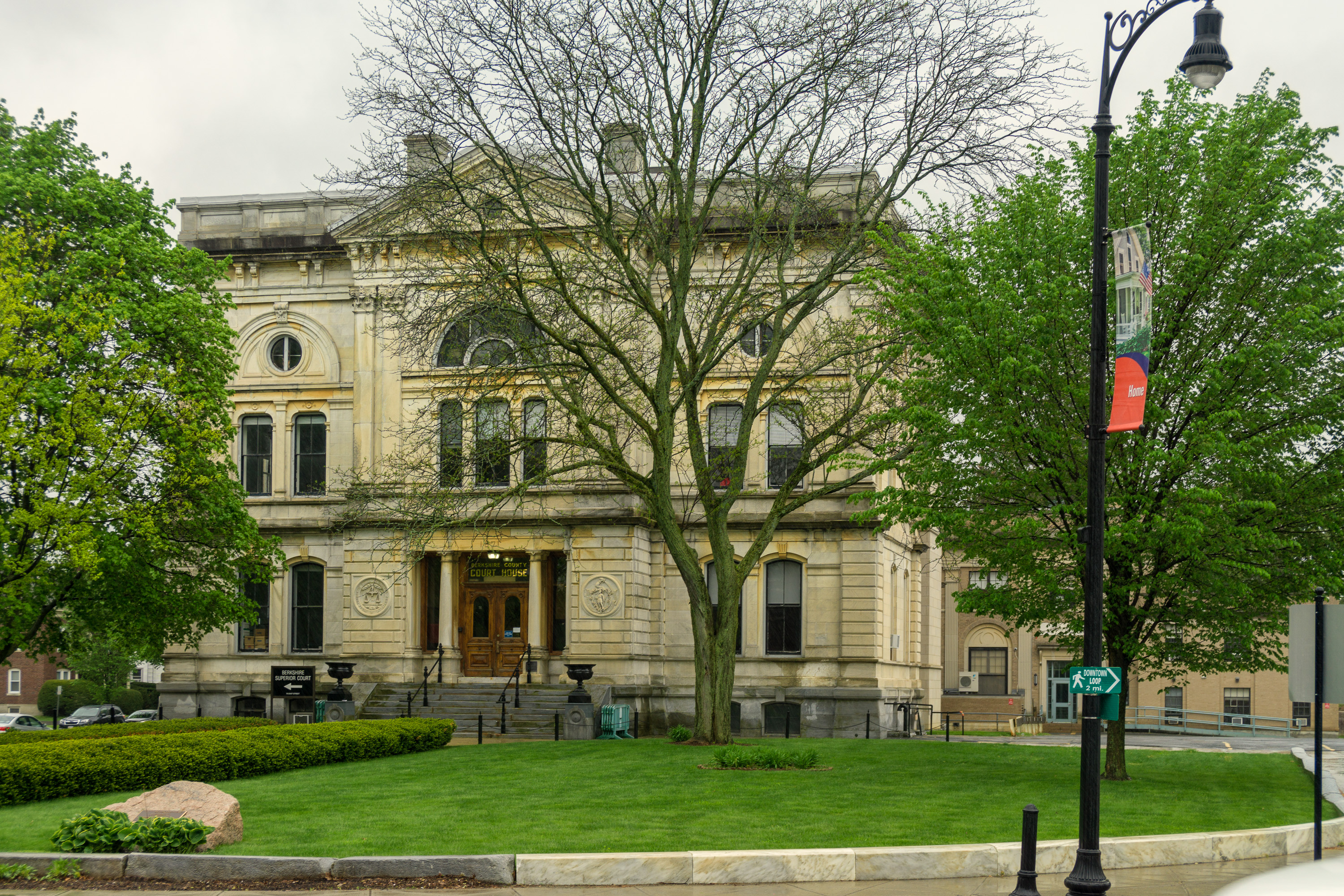
The Berkshire County Courthouse in Pittsfield, Massachusetts, built in 1869–71

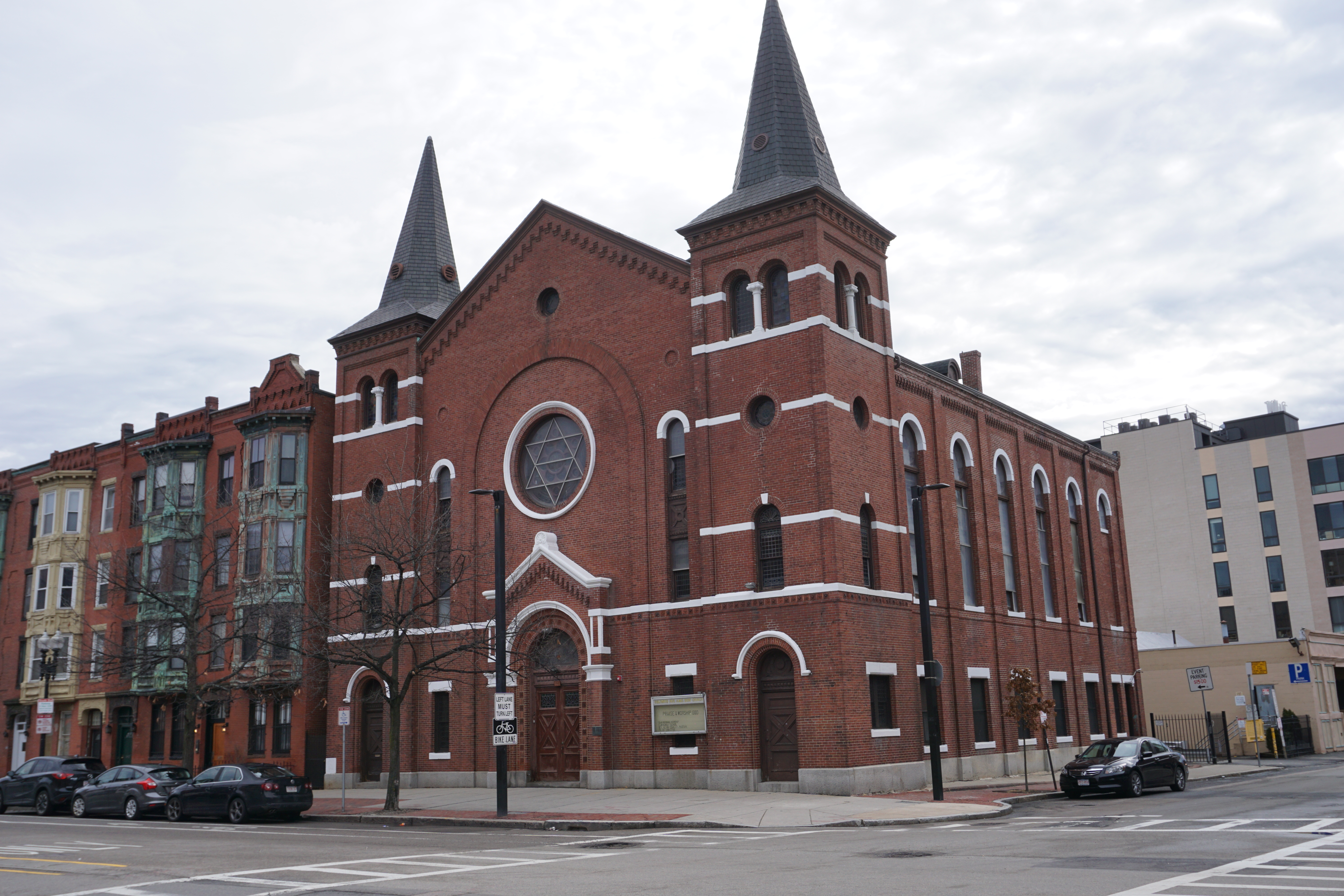
The former Temple Israel in Boston, designed by Weissbein & Jones and built in 1885

Louis Weissbein (1831–1913) was a German-born American architect practicing in Boston, Massachusetts. His major works include the original buildings of Boston College and Temple Israel, the latter of which is the oldest synagogue building in Massachusetts.

== Life and career ==
Louis Weissbein was born July 19, 1831, to Michael A. Weissbein and Johanna (Basch) Weissbein in Krotoschin, then under the control of Prussia but historically and presently a part of Poland. He was educated in a local school and studied with a government architect, followed by two years at the Bauakademie in Berlin. In 1854 he immigrated to the United States, settling in Boston. For four years he worked as a draftsman for various architects, including Richard Bond and Nathaniel J. Bradlee. In 1858 he established his own office in Boston. He was a sole practitioner until 1883, when he formed a partnership with William Hatch Jones, (Note: William Hatch Jones was born March 3, 1841, in Roxbury. He served in the Union Army for the full duration of the Civil War. He worked as a draftsman in several offices before and after the war before joining Weissbein. After the war he continued to be prominent in military affairs. He died January 14, 1903 in Roxbury.) who had joined Weissbein as a draftsman c. 1869. The firm of Weissbein & Jones was active until Jones' death in 1903. Weissbein then returned to private practice, retiring shortly before his death.

Weissbein was a Republican. During his term as Mayor of Boston, Hugh O'Brien proposed to appoint him City Architect of Boston, though he declined. In 1891 he was appointed to the Board of Commissioners of Prisons by Governor William E. Russell, and he resigned in 1894. Weissbein was a member of the American Institute of Architects from 1870 until 1895, and became a Fellow in 1889.

== Personal life ==
Weissbein was Jewish, and may have been the first Jewish architect to practice in Boston. He was one of the best-known German residents of Boston, and was a leader in local German society and philanthropy. For fifty years he was a member of the Orpheus Musical Society, a German singing society, and was president for 22 years.

Weissbein never married. He died December 10, 1913, in Boston. At his death he bequeathed four thousand dollars to the Massachusetts Institute of Technology to support scholarships for Jewish students.

== Legacy ==
Weissbein's major works include the original buildings of Boston College and Temple Israel, the latter of which is the oldest synagogue building in Massachusetts. He also designed a concentration of large buildings, including the courthouse, in Pittsfield, Massachusetts, one of which has been listed on the United States National Register of Historic Places. Many of his other works contribute to listed historic districts.

Weissbein established the Louis Weissbeing Scholarship Fund (1915) at the Massachusetts Institute of Technology "to found a scholarship to be awarded each year to a promising student, preference to be given a Jewish boy in making the award."

== Architectural works ==
- Boston College (former), (Note: A contributing property to the South End District, listed on the National Register of Historic Places in 1973.) 761 Harrison Ave, Boston, Massachusetts (1858–60)
- Washington Building, (Note: Designed in association with architect James H. Rand. Weissbein's obituary indicated that this was the first six-story commercial building in Boston.) 387 Washington St, Boston, Massachusetts (1859, demolished)
- Public Library of Brookline, 361 Washington St, Brookline, Massachusetts (1866–69, demolished)
- House for Louis Prang, (Note: A contributing property to the Roxbury Highlands Historic District, listed on the National Register of Historic Places in 1989.) 29 Centre St, Roxbury, Boston, Massachusetts (1867)
- L. Prang & Company factory, 1 Gardner St, Roxbury, Boston, Massachusetts (1867 et seq)
- Berkshire Life Insurance Company Building, (Note: A contributing property to the Park Square Historic District, listed on the National Register of Historic Places in 1975.) 5 North St, Pittsfield, Massachusetts (1868, altered 1911, NRHP 1986)
- Berkshire County Courthouse, 76 East St, Pittsfield, Massachusetts (1869–71, altered 1908)
- Berkshire County House of Correction, 264 2nd St, Pittsfield, Massachusetts (1869–71)
- Fire Station No. 1, 140 Washington St, Brookline, Massachusetts (1870–71, demolished 1907)
- Academy of Music, 160-196 North St, Pittsfield, Massachusetts (1872, burned 1912)
- Four houses for George Wheatland Jr., (Note: A contributing property to the Back Bay Historic District, listed on the National Register of Historic Places in 1973.) 225, 227, 229 and 231 Marlborough St, Boston, Massachusetts (1873–74)
- Dudley School, Roxbury, Boston, Massachusetts (1874, demolished)
- Hotel Comfort, (Note: A contributing property to the Dudley Station Historic District, listed on the National Register of Historic Places in 1985.) 10 Williams St, Roxbury, Boston, Massachusetts (1877–78)
- House for Henry Schreiber, (Note: This house was briefly owned by Mary Baker Eddy, who lived in the house in 1891.) 175 Poplar St, Roslindale, Boston, Massachusetts (1879)
- Morse Block, 58-72 South St, Boston, Massachusetts (1880–83, demolished)
- House for J. Avery Richards, 103 Newbury St, Boston, Massachusetts (1881, altered)
- Blake and Osborne Building, (Note: A contributing property to the Leather District, listed on the National Register of Historic Places in 1983.) 118 South St, Boston, Massachusetts (1883)
- House for Leopold Morse, Boston, Massachusetts (1884–85, altered 1929)
- Hecht Building, 207-209 Federal St, Boston, Massachusetts (1885–86, burned 1893)
- Hotel Dunbar, (Note: Later known as the Bartlett Building.) 2401 Washington St, Roxbury, Boston, Massachusetts (1885–86, burned 1982)
- Temple Israel (former), (Note: This was the second purpose-built synagogue building in Massachusetts, and the oldest still standing. Since 1903 this building has been the Columbus Avenue AME Zion Church.) 600 Columbus Ave, Boston, Massachusetts (1885)
- Soldiers' Home addition, Chelsea, Massachusetts (1889–90, demolished)
- Waterman Block, 2328 Washington St, Roxbury, Boston, Massachusetts (1890)
- Elysium Club, 218 Huntington Ave, Boston, Massachusetts (1891, demolished)
- Hecht Building, 207-221 Federal St, Boston, Massachusetts (1893, demolished)
- W. L. Lockhart & Company factory, (Note: Later consolidated into the National Casket Company.) 120 1st St, Cambridge, Massachusetts (1902, demolished)

== Gallery of architectural works ==
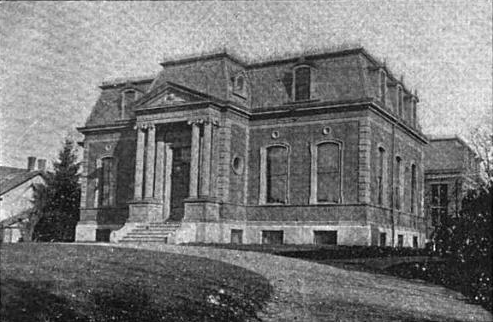
Public Library of Brookline, Brookline, Massachusetts, 1866-69.

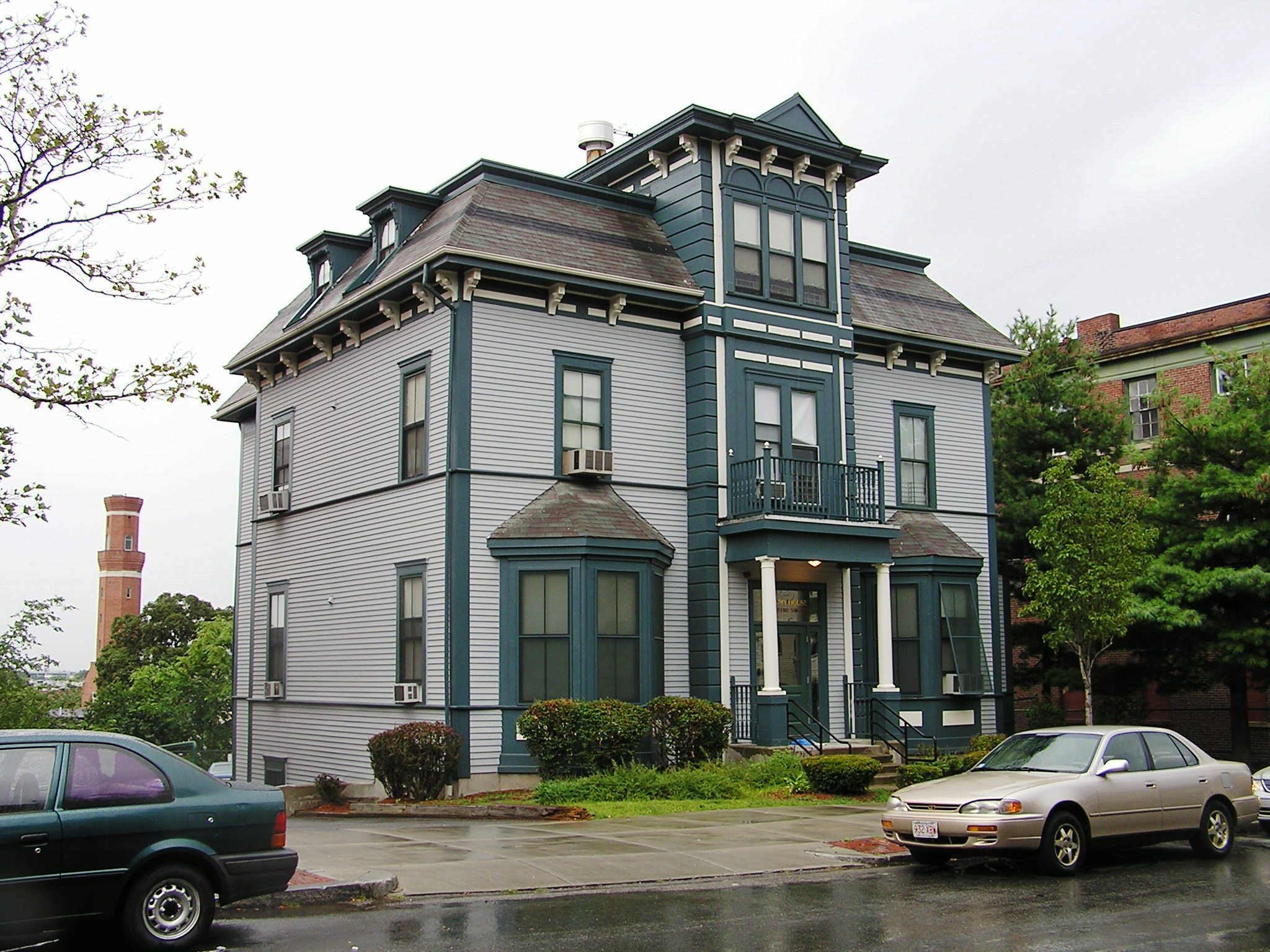
House for Louis Prang, Roxbury, Boston, Massachusetts, 1867.

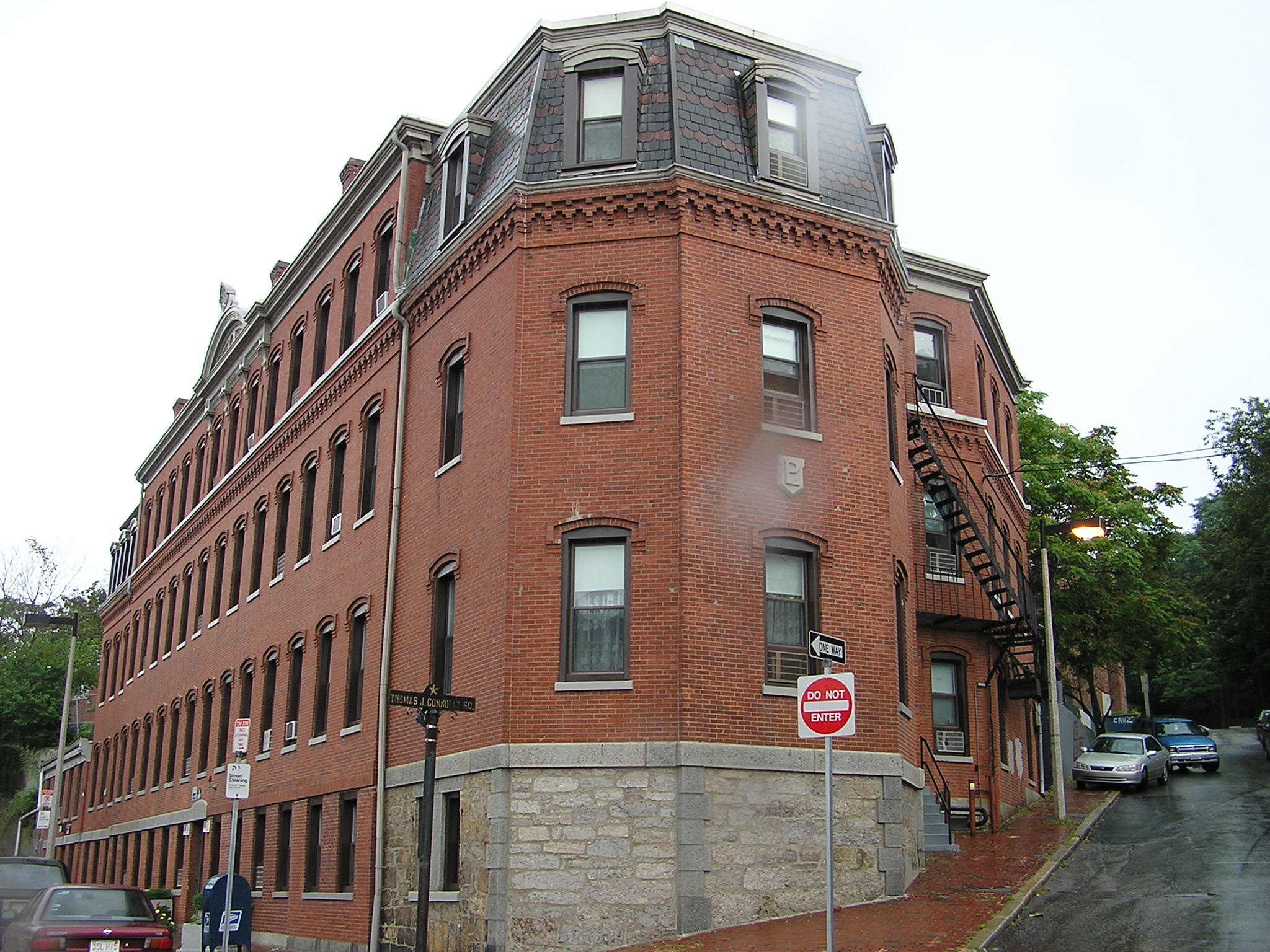
L. Prang & Company factory, Roxbury, Boston, Massachusetts, 1867 et seq.

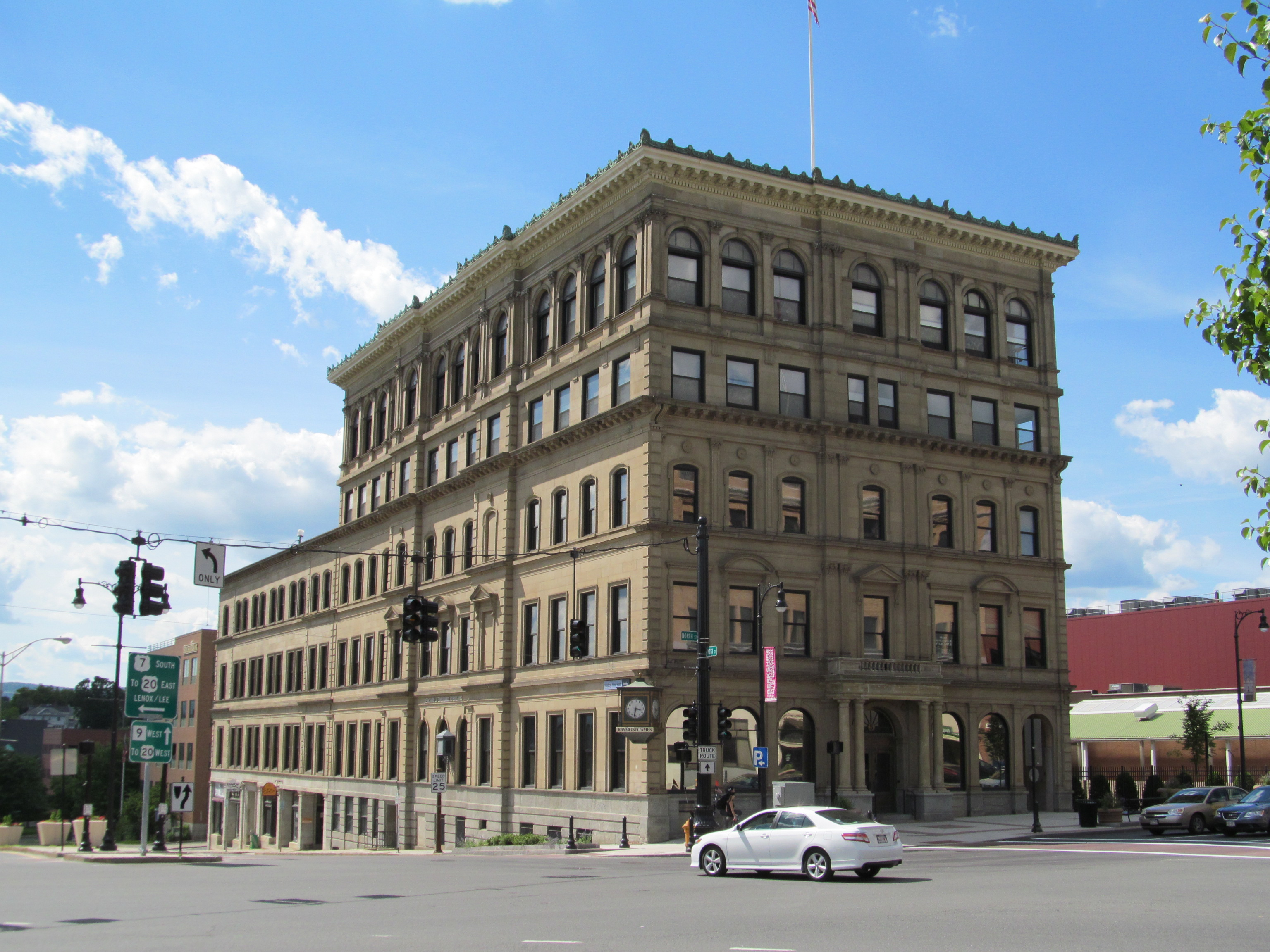
Berkshire Life Insurance Company Building, Pittsfield, Massachusetts, 1868.

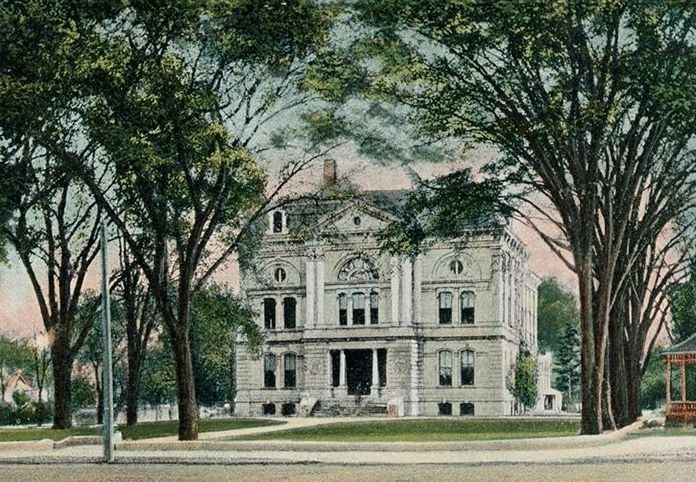
Berkshire County Courthouse, Pittsfield, Massachusetts, 1869-71, prior to alterations.

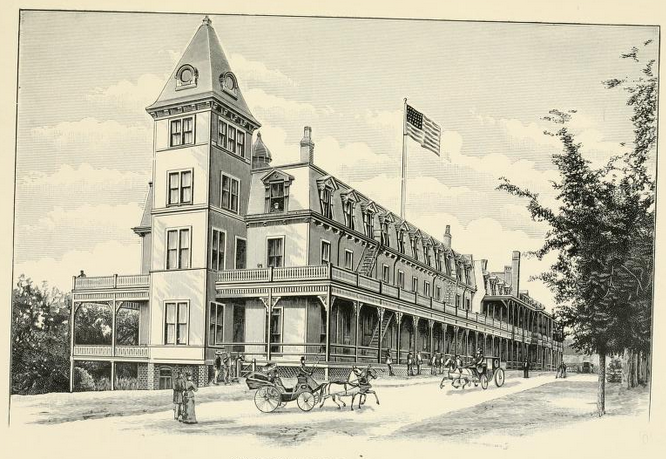
Soldiers' Home addition, Chelsea, Massachusetts, 1889-90.

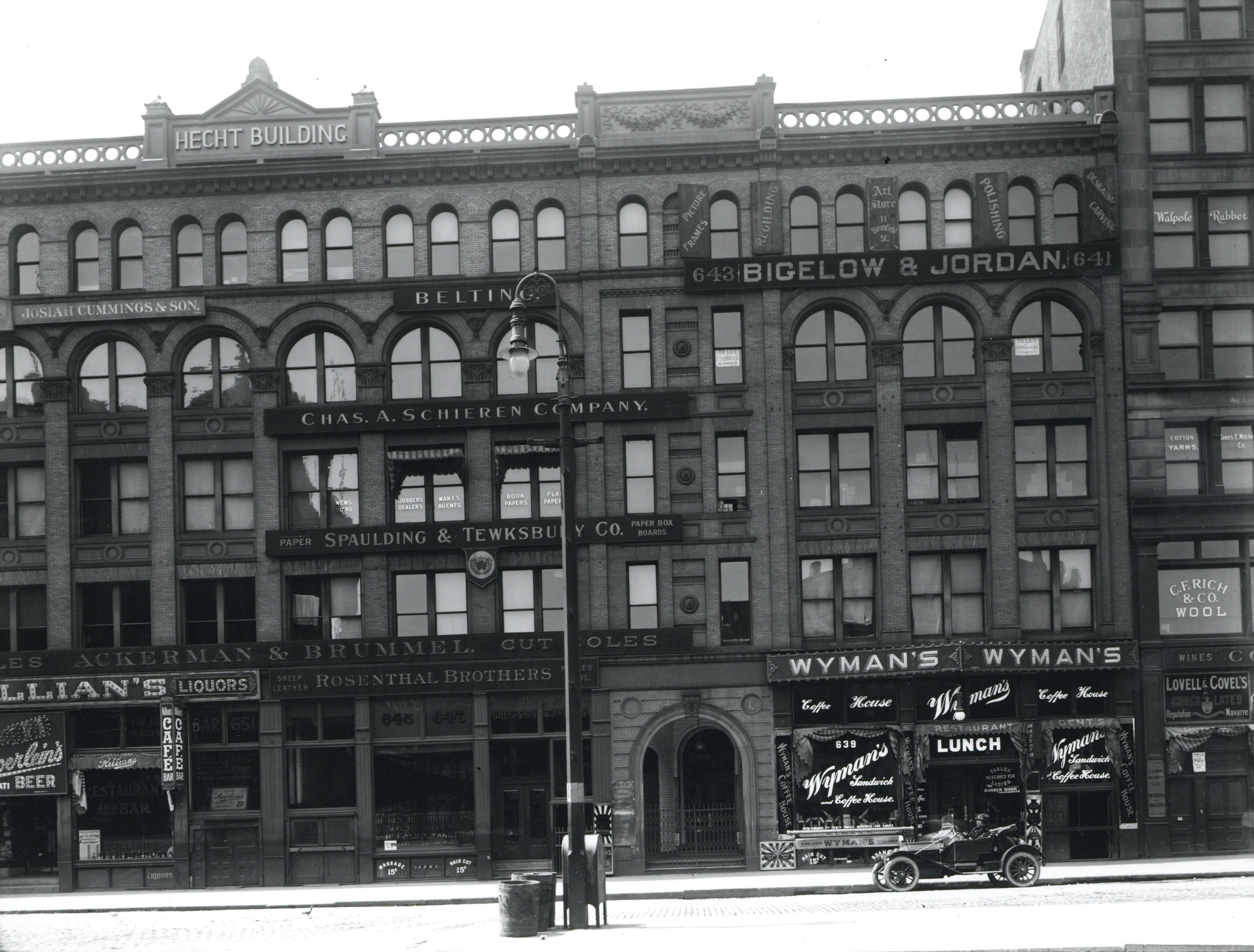
Hecht Building, Boston, Massachusetts, 1893.
