= Joseph McArthur Vance =

American architect

Joseph McArthur Vance (January 22, 1868 – December 14, 1948) was a prominent architect in Pittsfield, Massachusetts. His portfolio comprised residential, commercial, industrial and recreational buildings. Much of his work was centered in Pittsfield, then a thriving commercial, industrial and resort city, but he was also commissioned by clients elsewhere in Berkshire County. He also pursued projects in neighboring states. Among the buildings he designed are the Colonial Theatre (1903, with J. B. McElfatrick), the Allen Hotel⁣ – originally the Park Hotel – (1915), and the Frank Howard Building (1916) – all in Pittsfield; Bascom Lodge (1932-1937) atop Mount Greylock, the state's highest peak; and the Hotel Aspinwall in Lenox, Massachusetts (1902), which burned to the ground in 1931. Several buildings he designed are listed on the National Register of Historic Places.

Born in Chattanooga, Tennessee, on January 22, 1868, Vance was educated in the public schools there. He then attended Urbana University in Ohio, before studying architecture at the Massachusetts Institute of Technology. He left MIT in 1891 without taking a degree and began work in the office of architect Francis R. Allen of Boston. In 1894, Vance was sent to Pittsfield in western Massachusetts to supervise the construction of the Berkshire County Savings Bank building. Vance enjoyed life in Berkshire County – his MIT friend and fellow architecture student John H. C. Church lived in nearby Great Barrington; so he decided to remain in Pittsfield and make his career there. Vance became Francis Allen's partner in 1897 and remained associated with Allen until 1902.

While at Urbana, Vance was a pitcher for their baseball team, and it was said that he pitched a no-hit, no-run game. His interest in baseball continued into later life. He became an early supporter of Pittsfield's professional baseball team, the Hillies, and for two years in the 1920s was president of the city's ball club. Vance designed many improvements to the city's old grandstand at Wahconah Park. In the 1940s, he made plans for a new grandstand, which were put on hold because of the government's need for building material in World War II. The current grandstand, largely based on Vance's design, was finally constructed after his death. Vance was also an ace golfer. He was one of the founding members of the Country Club of Pittsfield, and was captain of the Club's golf team for many years. When the Country Club purchased its current site, Vance was responsible for converting the mansion there into the clubhouse.

Vance was also very interested in the theater. He appeared in a number of local stage productions, in both straight plays and operettas. He was particularly known for his comic roles. During the heyday of the little theater movement in the United States, Vance helped organized Pittsfield's Town Players, a theater group that is still active today; it was Vance who suggested the group's name.

Vance was very active in the social life of the Berkshires and utilized his social connections to build his career. Many of his residential projects were designed for friends and acquaintances, such as Bonny Bank, the home of John Church in Great Barrington, and One West Street in Lenox, Massachusetts. Many of his commercial projects came to him through those same connections, such as the Mahaiwe Block and Theatre in Great Barrington. Vance's architecture practice continued to thrive even during and after the Great Depression, when other Pittsfield architects were complaining of lack of work. In his last years, after the Second World War, Vance was still at work promoting his design for the Wahconah Park grandstand project.

Joseph McArthur Vance died at his home in Pittsfield on December 14, 1948. Surviving him were his wife, Grace Hersey Vance (1870-1950), whom he married in 1899, and his son, Joseph Colville Vance (1901-1957). He was predeceased by another son, Duncan McArthur Vance (1911-1914).

== Work ==
- Berkshire County Savings Bank Building (1896), supervising architect. He had his office on the top floor of this building in rooms overlooking Park Square.
- Cherry Hill (Dr. Charles McBurney residence) (1897) (Stockbridge, Massachusetts)
- New American House hotel (1899) (North Adams, Massachusetts), demolished 1935
- Richmond Hotel (1901) (North Adams, Massachusetts), demolished 1970
- Club House renovation (1901) Country Club of Pittsfield
- Hotel Aspinwall (1902) (Lenox, Massachusetts), burned to the ground in 1931
- Stockbridge Public Library (1902, renovation) (Stockbridge, Massachusetts)
- Colonial Theatre (Pittsfield, Massachusetts) (1903) (NRHP listed) The Colonial reopened as a theatre in 2006 after a $22 million restoration.
- Greenock Hotel (1903, and 1908 rebuilding after fire) (Lee, Massachusetts)
- Bonny Bank (J. H. C. Church residence) (1905) (Great Barrington, Massachusetts)
- Mahaiwe Theater (1905) in Great Barrington (restored and reopened) now the Mahaiwe Performing Arts Center in the Berkshires (NRHP listed as the Mahaiwe Block)
- Morningside Engine House (1906)
- Majestic (1910), later renamed The Palace, on North Street, demolished 1993
- Manual Arts School Building, currently Percival Hall (1910) Fitchburg State University (Fitchburg, Massachusetts)
- Putnam County Savings Bank (1911) (Brewster, New York)
- Berkshire Life Insurance Company Building, 1911 addition of two stories (NRHP listed). This addition included rooms for the Park Club, Pittsfield's businessmen's club, to which Vance belonged for fifty years.
- St. James Church Parish House (1912) (Great Barrington, Massachusetts)
- Empire Theatre (1913) (North Adams, Massachusetts), demolished 1967
- Morningside Baptist Church (1913)
- Clubhouse, Wyantenuck Country Club (1914) (Great Barrington, Massachusetts)
- Masonic Temple (1914) Vance was the first man to be inducted as a Mason when the new Temple was dedicated.
- Park Hotel, later Allen Hotel at 17 Wendell Avenue (1915) (NRHP listed)
- Frank Howard Building at 124-132 Fenn Street / 67-71 Federal Street (1916) (NRHP listed)
- Kinnell-Kresge Building, currently Beacon Cinema (1918)
- Town Hall (1923) (Richmond, Massachusetts)
- First Church of Christ, Scientist (1926)
- Hall of Records, later Registry of Deeds (1928)
- Town Library, currently Police Department building (1929) (Sheffield, Massachusetts)
- Post Office (1929) (Dalton, Massachusetts)
- First Baptist Church (1930)
- Bascom Lodge (1932-1937) atop Mount Greylock, part of the Mount Greylock Summit Historic District
- Thunderbolt Ski Shelter (1940) atop Mount Greylock
- Shelter House at Springside Park, 874 North St Pittsfield, MA (1941) (NRHP listed)
- Grandstand at Wahconah Park (1949)
- One West Street (Lenox, Massachusetts) Designed for Dr.Edward T Forsley in 1940.
