= Hebert Arboretum =

Arboretum in Pittsfield, Massachusetts, United States

Coordinates: 42.463°N 73.244°W

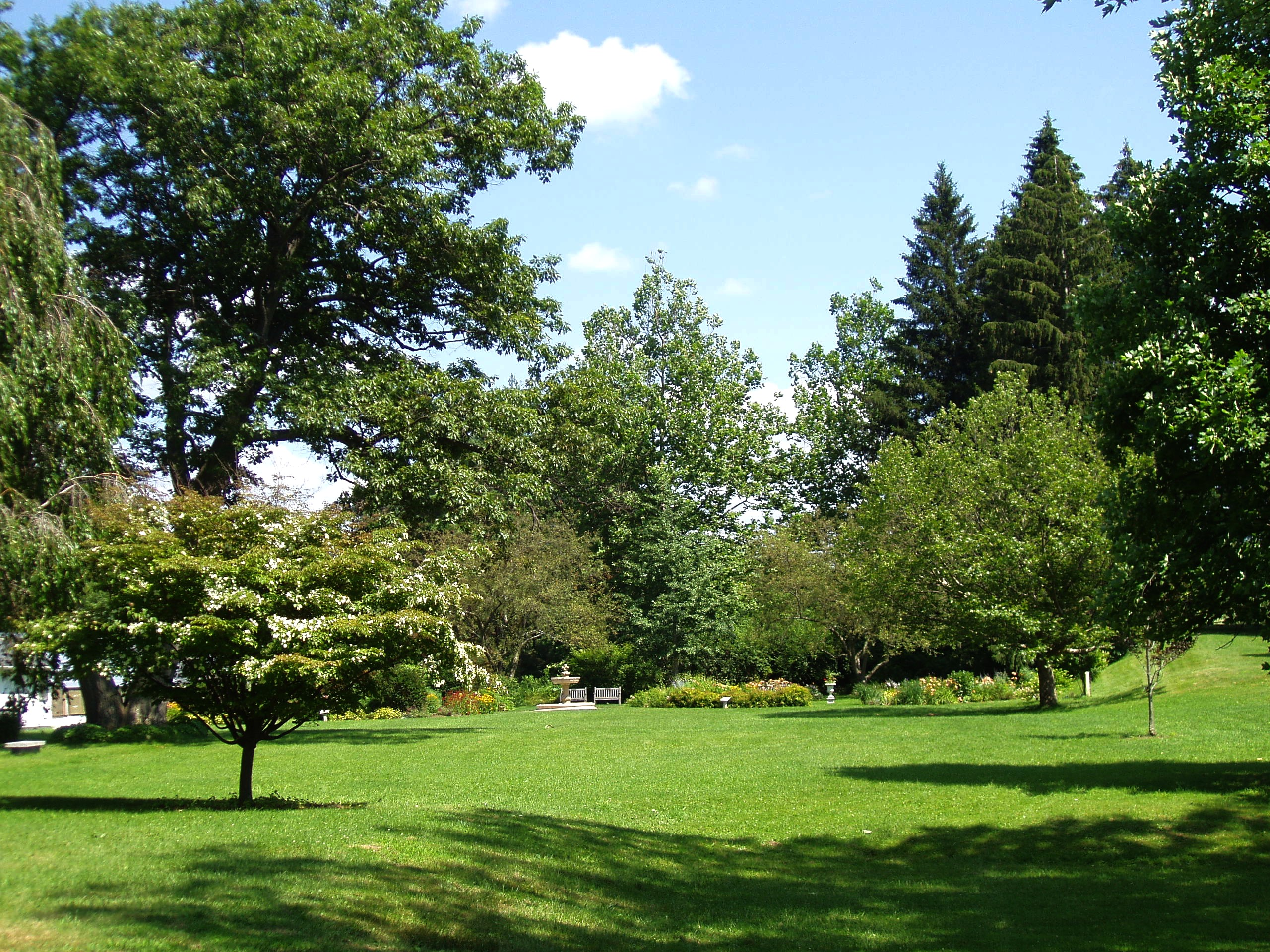
- Interactive map of Hebert Arboretum

The Hebert Arboretum is a new arboretum located at Springside Park in Pittsfield, Massachusetts, United States. The Arboretum displays a diverse collection of trees and other plants in formal landscapes in a natural setting.

The Arboretum was officially established in 1999 to carry out a dream of former Parks Superintendent Vincent Hebert. A master plan was developed by students at the Conway School of Landscape Design in Conway, Massachusetts, and an ecological restoration and landscape design was created for the lower pond area.

== See also ==
- List of botanical gardens in the United States
