= Joshua L. Liebman =

American rabbi

Joshua Loth Liebman
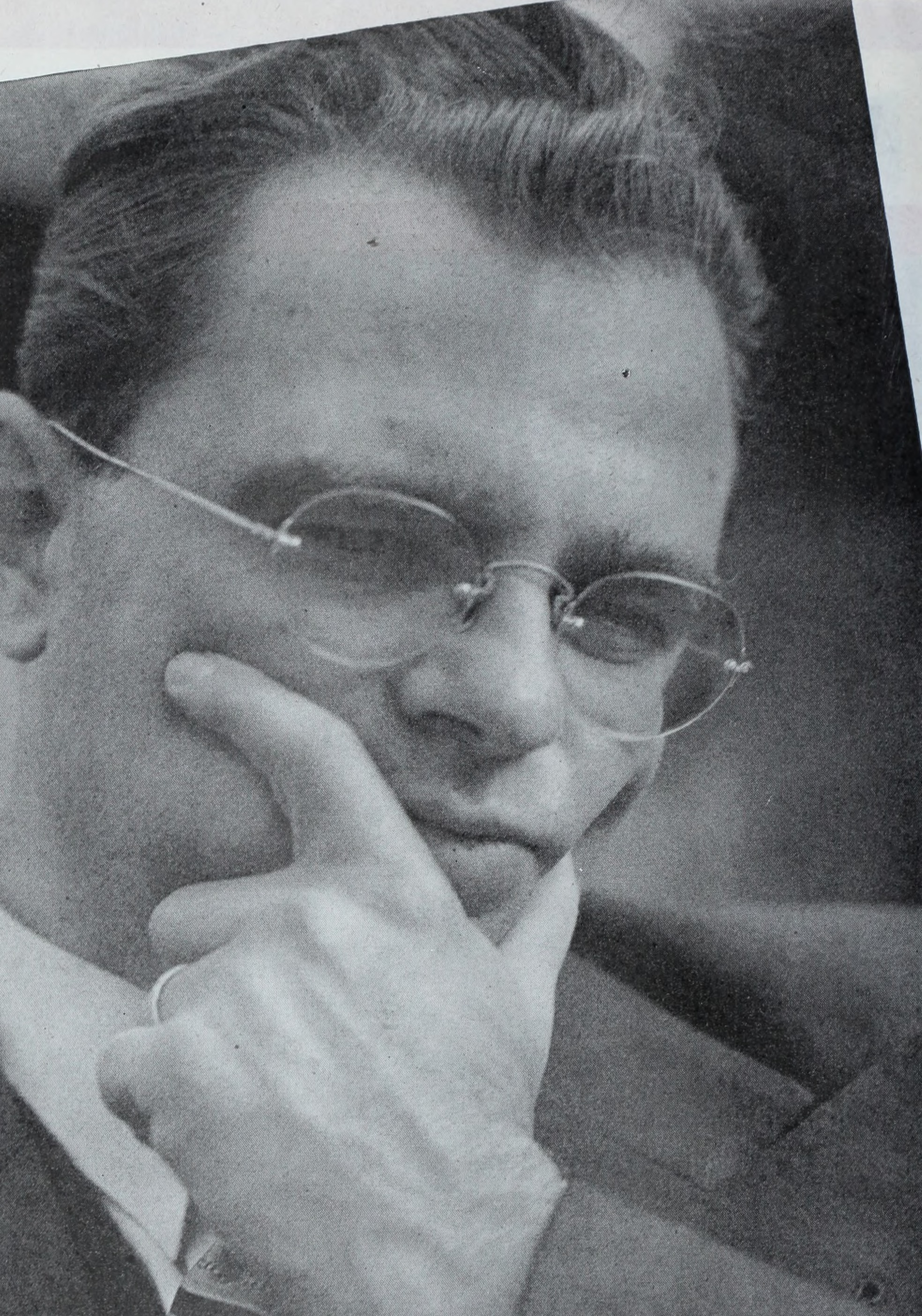
- Photo of the rabbi from the 1948 Ladies Home Journal
- Born: Joshua Loth Liebman; April 7, 1907; Hamilton, Ohio
- Died: June 9, 1948 (aged 41)
- Occupation(s): Rabbi, author
- Notable work: Peace of Mind
- Spouse: Fan Loth Liebman

Joshua Loth Liebman (April 7, 1907 – June 9, 1948) was an American Reform rabbi and best-selling author, best known for the book Peace of Mind, which spent more than a year at #1 on the New York Times Best Seller list.

== Biography ==
Born in Hamilton, Ohio, Liebman graduated from the University of Cincinnati when he was 19 years old. He went on to be ordained and also earned a doctorate in Hebrew letters from Hebrew Union College. From 1934 to 1939, Liebman served as rabbi of K.A.M. Temple in Chicago, Illinois. In 1939, Liebman became the rabbi of Temple Israel, a Reform synagogue in Boston, Massachusetts.

A sermon Liebman gave at Temple Israel, titled "The Road to Inner Serenity", was published as a pamphlet by one of his friends, bookstore owner Richard Fuller, who passed it on to publisher Richard L. Simon of Simon & Schuster. Simon & Schuster then arranged to publish Liebman's self-help book titled Peace of Mind, issued in 1946, which sought to reconcile religion and psychiatry. Liebman had himself previously undergone psychoanalysis. In Peace of Mind, Liebman "addressed himself to the individual whose personal grief and anxiety, unassuageable by social betterment alone, required an inner peace that psychology and religion, working together, could provide." Peace of Mind became one of the year's best-selling books. Reaching #1 on the New York Times nonfiction best-sellers list on October 27, 1946, Peace of Mind held the top position on the list for a total of 58 (non-consecutive) weeks, and spent more than three straight years on the list. (In 1949, Roman Catholic Bishop Fulton J. Sheen responded to Liebman's assertions by publishing a book of his own entitled Peace of Soul.)

Scholar Andrew R. Heinze has described the impact of Peace of Mind as follows: "In its time, Peace of Mind was something of a cultural earthquake, allowing subterranean plates of religion, gender and ethnicity to find a new alignment in postwar America. Or, to invoke a commercial metaphor, Peace of Mind marked the arrival of Judaism in a marketplace of Christian goods. When Judaism appeared, it came with the colorful plastic of postwar psychology. Thus bundled, the old faith and the new therapy broke the religion monopoly of twentieth-century America."

In September 1947, the rabbi and his wife Fan took in a teenager, Leila Bornstein, a Polish-born survivor of the Auschwitz concentration camp. Leila's parents and two younger sisters perished in the camp. The rabbi and his wife had been childless for the past 19 years and would later adopt Leila. A brief article on the family was featured in The Ladies' Home Journal in January 1948.

While Peace of Mind was still on the best-sellers list, Liebman died at age 41 on June 9, 1948. Liebman's death was attributed to a "heart attack" or "heart ailment", with one obituary reporting that he had a heart attack following a severe case of influenza. He is buried in the Temple Israel Cemetery in Wakefield, Massachusetts.
