= Abraham Klausner =

American Reform rabbi and military chaplain

Abraham Judah Klausner (April 27, 1915 – June 28, 2007) was a Reform rabbi and United States Army captain and chaplain who became a “father figure” for the more than 30,000 emaciated survivors found at Dachau Concentration Camp, 10 miles (16 km) northwest of Munich, shortly after it was liberated on April 29, 1945. He also cared for thousands more left homeless in camps as the victorious Allied Forces determined where they should go.

== Early life and career ==
Abraham Judah Klausner was born in Memphis, Tennessee, on April 27, 1915, one of five children of Joseph Klausner, a Hungarian immigrant who owned a dry goods store, and Tillie Binstalk Klausner, an Austrian immigrant. He was raised in Denver, Colorado. He graduated from the University of Denver in 1938 and was ordained at Hebrew Union College in 1941.

== Holocaust ==
Following ordination, Klausner joined the army and served as a chaplain at the Lawson General Hospital in Atlanta, Georgia. Klausner eventually shipped out to Germany and was assigned to join the 116th Evacuation Hospital, which had just entered Dachau. The 116th Evacuation Hospital arrived at Dachau, which was 10 miles northwest of Munich, in May 1945, three weeks after the camp had been liberated on April 29, 1945. While Rabbi Eli Bohnen was the first Jewish chaplain in the United States Army to arrive at the Dachau concentration camp after its liberation, Bohnen’s unit remained only a short time. Rabbi Klausner arrived soon after.

During his first days at Dachau, survivors asked him over and over if he knew their family members and if he could provide aid in finding them. Experiences such as these convinced Klausner of the importance of working to reunite families that had been separated by the war. In the several weeks that the 116th Evacuation Hospital was stationed at Dachau, Rabbi Klausner worked to find the 32,000 survivors bedding and food, including kosher provisions.

He also worked to put together lists of survivors at Dachau and made sure that these lists, which he called "Sharit Ha-Platah" or "surviving remnant", were posted at other camps. Klausner eventually published six volumes of the "Sharit Ha-Platah" lists and distributed them worldwide. He traveled throughout Bavaria looking for survivors, helping to reunite families and setting up a center for survivors at the Deutsches Museum in Munich. Those who did not find the names of relatives on the "Sharit Ha-Platah" lists wrote notes and tacked them to the walls at the center, in the hopes that relatives might visit and find them.

When the 116th Evacuation Hospital was ordered to move on to an Army rest camp, Klausner initially went with them but surreptitiously returned to Dachau against Army orders and told the commander of the 127th Evacuation Hospital unit at Dachau that he had been reassigned. Eventually the 127th would also depart Dachau, on a day that Klausner was traveling around Bavaria, allowing Klausner to remain behind once again.

Klausner photographed in 1945

The conditions in Dachau, as at all the former concentration camps and the Displaced Persons (DP) camps, were often quite bad with overcrowding and inadequate food, shelter, clothing, and medical supplies. On July 1, 1945, at the Feldafing Displaced Persons camp near Dachau, Klausner and Zalman Grinberg, a survivor of Dachau, established the Central Committee of the Liberated Jews in the U.S. Zone of Germany as the official representative body of the Jewish DPs. The purpose of the Central Committee was to champion the interests of the Jewish DPs and to draw attention to their plight. Klausner was horrified by the fact that the survivors were still living in the camps in much the same conditions as they had under the Nazis. He wrote letters of protest including detailed reports about these conditions and sent them up the army chain of command. Klausner also wrote to various Jewish organizations in the United States, which he felt were not doing all that they could to help the survivors. Klausner did whatever he felt was necessary to get the Jewish DPs what they needed including setting up Jewish hospitals and procuring clothes, food and medical supplies and, while he did a great deal of good, his actions often put him at odds with the army, the Red Cross, the United Nations Relief and Rehabilitation Administration, and various Jewish organizations.

When Earl G. Harrison, dean of the University of Pennsylvania Law School and U.S. representative to the Intergovernmental Committee on Refugees, arrived in Germany in July 1945 to investigate conditions in the DP camps—on an assignment from Acting Secretary of State Joseph Grew and, through Grew's efforts, carrying a letter of interest and support from President Truman—Klausner met with him in Dachau, and served as his guide in visits to the camps at Landsberg, Feldafing, St. Ottilien, and elsewhere, making sure that Harrison became acquainted with representatives of the Jewish DPs, and observed first-hand the actual conditions. (The small group with whom Harrison worked together, including Joseph J. Schwartz, European director of the JDC, toured all together about thirty DP camps.) Harrison’s report to President Truman maintained that the living conditions of the DPs under the supervision of the United States’ Army were not much better than they had been under the Nazis. Harrison also recommended that the Jewish survivors should be sent to Palestine rather than sending them back to their countries of origin, an idea Klausner actively supported. On orders from General Eisenhower, conditions soon improved in the camps.

Klausner's work on behalf of Holocaust survivors has been included in all major historical records of the period. His own memoir includes experiences unique to his time in Germany.

== Later career ==
Klausner around retirement age

After the establishment of the State of Israel, Klausner left the military and began recruiting pilots and nurses for the Israeli Defense Forces in the United States. He became Provost of the Hebrew Union College in 1948, and was the Senior Rabbi at Temple Israel in Boston from 1949 to 1953. During this time, Klausner also earned a Doctorate in Divinity at Harvard University. He was the rabbi at Temple Emanu-El in Yonkers from 1954 until his retirement in 1989, when he moved to Santa Fe, New Mexico.

Rabbi Klausner wrote several books, including Weddings: A Complete Guide to All Religious and Interfaith Marriage Services, which provides texts of Protestant, Roman Catholic, Jewish, Russian Orthodox and Muslim wedding services, and suggestions for combining texts of different faiths; A Child’s Prayer Book; and his memoir, A Letter to My Children: From the Edge of the Holocaust. He was also featured in the 1997 Academy Award-winning documentary The Long Way Home, about Holocaust survivors in the immediate aftermath of the liberation of the concentration camps.

In 1966, Klausner married Judith Steinberg and adopted two children from Steinberg's previous marriage (Robin and Michael). He and Steinberg also had two children of their own, sons Jeremy and Amos.

Abraham Klausner died June 28, 2007, of complications from Parkinson’s disease at the age of 92.

== Legacy ==
Apart from his book about the Holocaust, Klausner wrote four books including Weddings: A Complete Guide to all Religious and Interfaith Marriage Services published in 1986.

== Bibliography ==
- Klausner, Abraham J. (1974). A child's prayer book for the holidays of Rosh Hashanah and Yom Kippur. Yonkers, New York: Emanu-El Press. LCCN 76373093.
- Klausner, Abraham J. (1978). Kodesh: The history, art & artifacts of Temple Emanu-El, Yonkers, New York. Temple Emanu-El. ASIN B0006WWLUY.
- Klausner, Abraham J. (1986). Weddings : a complete guide to all religious and interfaith marriage services. Columbus, Ohio: Alpha Pub. Co. ISBN 0-933771-00-2.
- Klausner, Abraham J. (2002). A Letter to My Children: From the Edge of the Holocaust. Holocaust Center of Northern California. ISBN 0-9718695-0-2.
