= Frank Howard Building =

- U.S. National Register of Historic Places
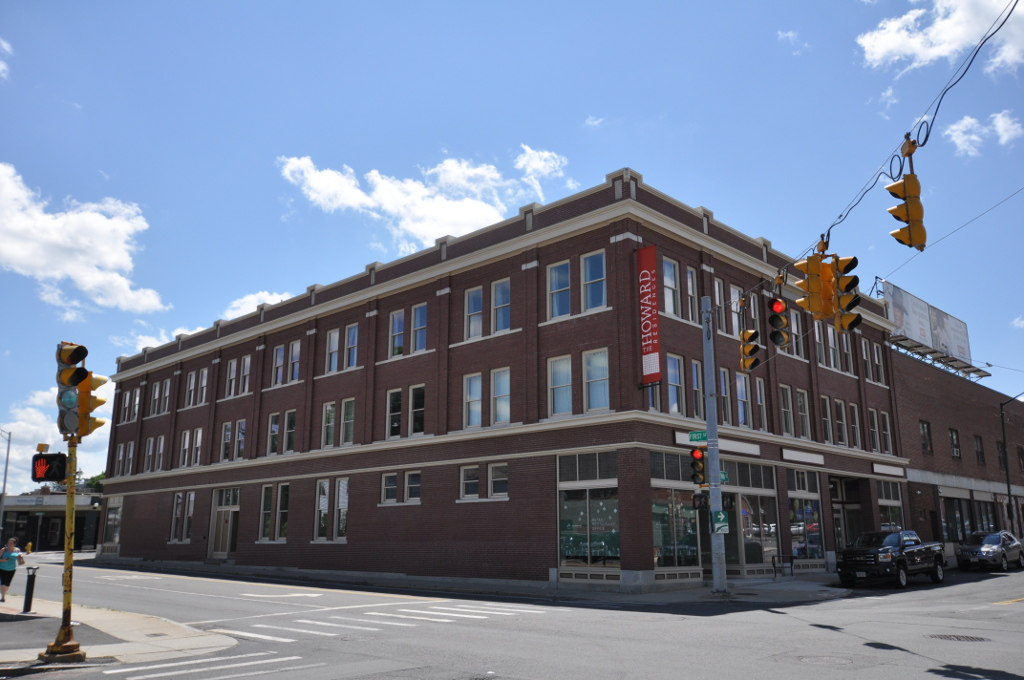

- Location within Massachusetts Location within the United States
- Location: 124-132 Fenn Street, 67-71 Federal Street, Pittsfield, Massachusetts
- Coordinates: 42°26′59″N 73°15′7″W
- Built: 1916
- Architect: Joseph McArthur Vance
- Architectural style: Classical Revival, Other
- NRHP reference No.: 12000499
- Added to NRHP: August 14, 2012

The Frank Howard Building is a commercial building at 124–132 Fenn Street and 67–71 Federal Street in Pittsfield, Massachusetts. The 1916 Classical Revival building was designed by Joseph McArthur Vance, a prominent local architect, and is the best preserved of his works. It was listed on the National Register of Historic Places in 2012.

== Description and history ==
The Frank Howard Building occupies the eastern portion of a city block, facing Fenn, Federal and 1st Streets to the northeast of Pittsfield's central Park Square. It is a three-story timber-framed structure, its exterior clad in brick with limestone trim, resting on a granite foundation. The north facade faces Fenn Street, and has two commercial storefronts, each with plate glass display windows and recessed entrances. That on the right is slightly larger, and originally housed Frank Howard's hardware business. The upper floors of the street-facing facades are divided into pairs of bays, separated by brick pilasters. Sash windows are set in rectangular openings, with stone lintels, and stringcourses serving as sills beneath them on the third floor. The building is topped by a decorative parapet surrounding a flat roof.

The block was built for Frank Howard, owner of a successful hardware and agricultural implements business, after Howard lost the lease on his existing storefront on North Street. The building was designed by Joseph McArthur Vance, a local architect who had designed other commercial buildings in downtown Pittsfield. The Howard building represents one of the best preserved of Vance's works.

Frank Howard's sons continued to run the family business in the building until 1960, making only modest alterations to it. The building remained in the hands of his surviving son Arthur, after which it had a succession of owners. Portions of the building remained vacant throughout this time, and in 2010 it was sold to A.C. Enterprises, which is overseeing a historically sensitive conversion to mixed used.

== See also ==
- National Register of Historic Places listings in Berkshire County, Massachusetts
