= Mahaiwe Performing Arts Center =

Performing Arts Center in Great Barrington, MA, USA

Coordinates: 42.1943°N 73.3635°W

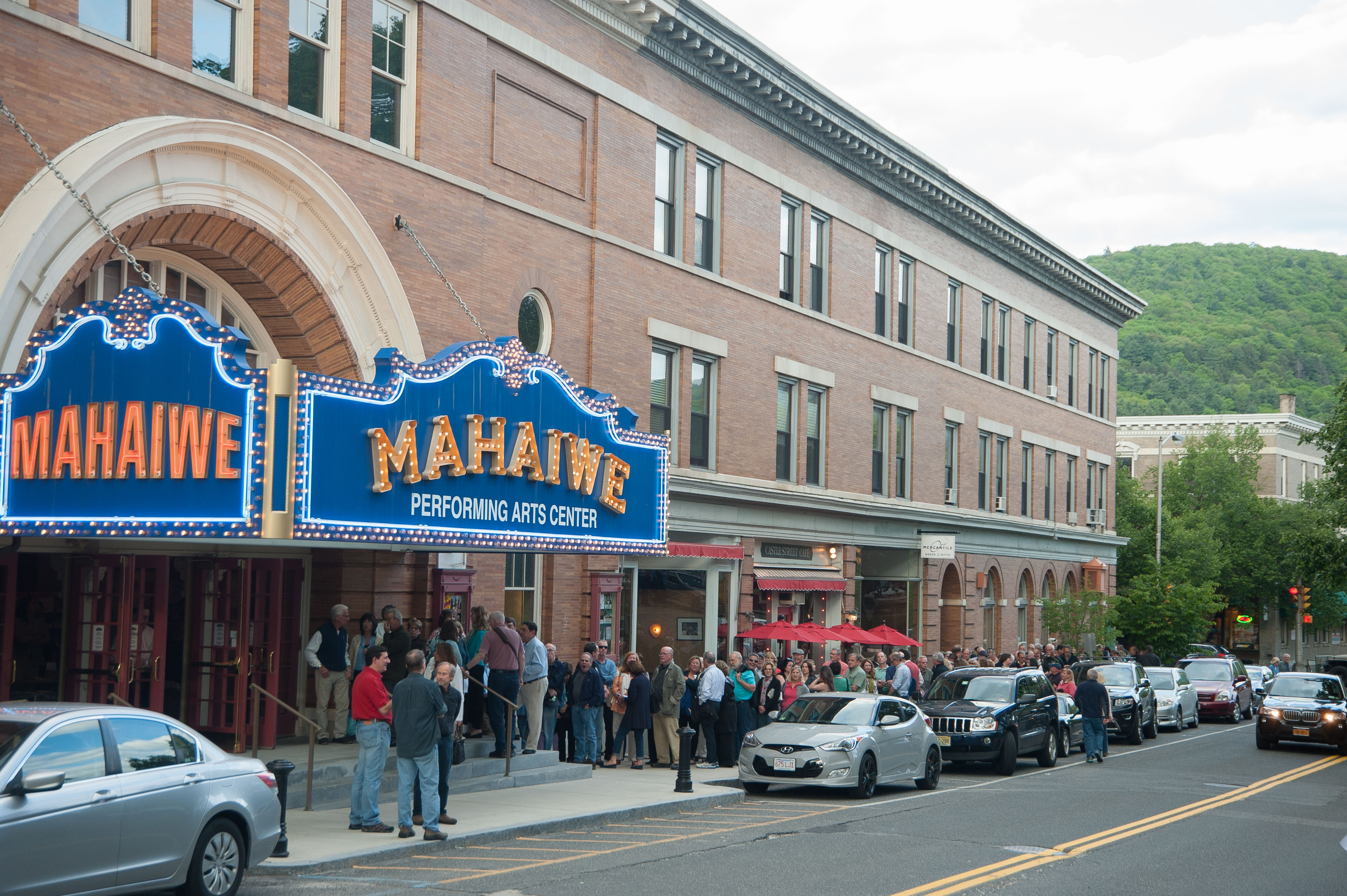
- Front of the Mahaiwe Performing Arts Center Front of Mahaiwe Performing Arts Center
- Website: mahaiwe.org
- Location: 14 Castle St., Great Barrington, MA
- Built: 1905
- Non-profit active: 2005 - present
- Founder: Lola Jaffe

The Mahaiwe Performing Arts Center (/məˈheɪwi/) is a major performance space in the town of Great Barrington, Massachusetts. The theater's name comes from the indigenous Mahican term for "the place downstream" in relation to the Housatonic River. The theater itself has hosted events for the Berkshire County community since it was built in 1905 and as the performing arts center since 2005, with offerings ranging from movies to live music, dance, drama, and comedy.

== History ==
Construction of the Mahaiwe Block building that houses the theater began in 1904, led by architect Joseph McArthur Vance. The Mahaiwe Theater first opened its doors on September 26, 1905, with the musical comedy Happyland as the main performance. The theater offered silent films, vaudeville acts, big bands, and later on “talkies” in 1929. Several notable figures visited the Mahaiwe in its early years, including John Philip Sousa, who performed with his band in 1912; and later Pauline Kael, who frequently rented out the theater to critique movies sent for her to review.

In 2002, philanthropist Lola Jaffe founded a nonprofit organization to restore and run the theater. Jaffe raised and invested over $9 million with the help of a board of directors. Hugh Hardy, an American architect known for reviving theaters and other public spaces, led the restoration project. The theater re-opened officially as the Mahaiwe Performing Arts Center on May 29, 2005. The nonprofit organization is a part of the Downtown Great Barrington Cultural District.

Recent performers of note since the restoration include Whoopi Goldberg, Leslie Odom Jr., John Mulaney, and Jane Lynch
