= Allen Hotel =

- U.S. National Register of Historic Places
- U.S. Historic district – Contributing property
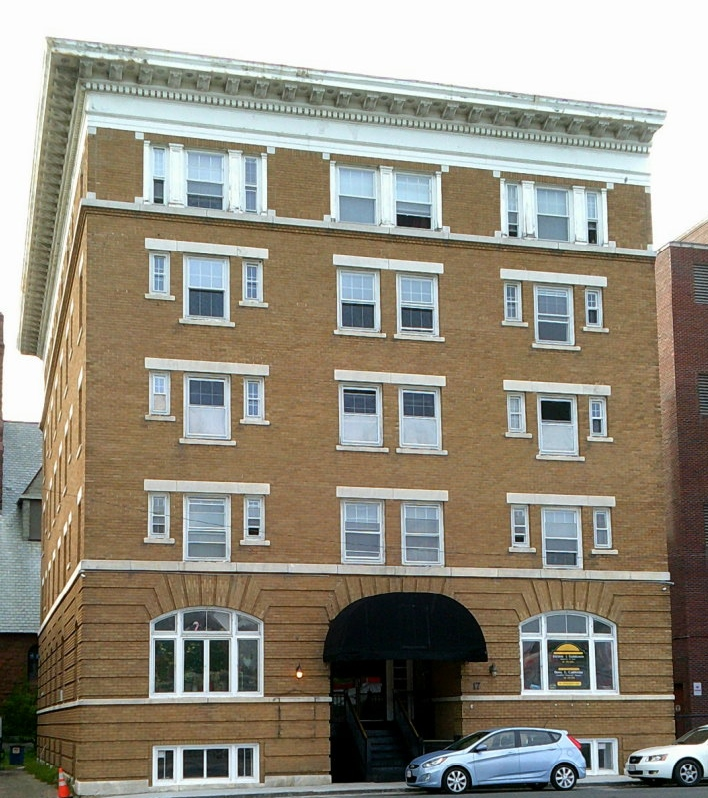

- Location within Massachusetts Location within the United States
- Location: 17 Wendell Ave. Ext., Pittsfield, Massachusetts
- Coordinates: 42°26′55″N 73°15′9″W
- Built: 1914
- Built by: Louis Larouche
- Architect: Joseph McArthur Vance
- Architectural style: None listed
- Part of: Park Square Historic District (ID75001911)
- NRHP reference No.: 83000566

Significant dates
- Added to NRHP: September 1, 1983
- Designated CP: December 23, 1991

The Allen Hotel is an historic hotel building in Pittsfield, Massachusetts. Built in 1915 and first operated as the Park Hotel, it is a significant local example of Renaissance Revival architecture, designed by the prominent local architect Joseph McArthur Vance. It was individually listed on the National Register of Historic Places in 1975, and included in an expansion of Pittsfield's Park Square Historic District in 1991. It no longer houses a hotel, and has been repurposed for other uses.

== Description and history ==
The former Allen Hotel building stands in downtown Pittsfield on the west side of Wendell Avenue Extension, just north of East Street (United States Route 7). It is a five-story steel and masonry structure, its exterior finished in buff yellow brick with marble trim. It is crowned by a flat roof with an extended cornice decorated with modillions and dentil moulding. The front facade is divided into three sections. The ground floor functions as a raised basement, with wide segmented-arch housing multipart windows flanking a deeply recessed entrance. A narrow trim string course runs at the base of the windows, with a wider one separating the first and second levels. The second through fourth levels each have paired sash windows in the center, sharing a common lintel, while the side bays have rectangular windows in an inverted Palladian form. Another string course separates the fourth and fifth floors, with three-part windows flanking central paired windows.

The hotel was built in 1915 by Louis Larouche to a design by Joseph McArthur Vance, a prominent local architect. The site was originally the home of Pittsfield's first minister, Rev. Thomas Allen, and had remained in his family until 1913. Originally called the Park Hotel, it was renamed the Allen Hotel by new owners in the 1930s, and that name remained with it for some time. In 1991 it was operating as the Wendell House Hotel; it has since been repurposed for other uses.

== See also ==
- National Register of Historic Places listings in Berkshire County, Massachusetts

== See also ==
- National Register of Historic Places listings in Berkshire County, Massachusetts
