= Temple Israel Cemetery (Wakefield, Massachusetts) =

Historic Jewish cemetery

- U.S. National Register of Historic Places
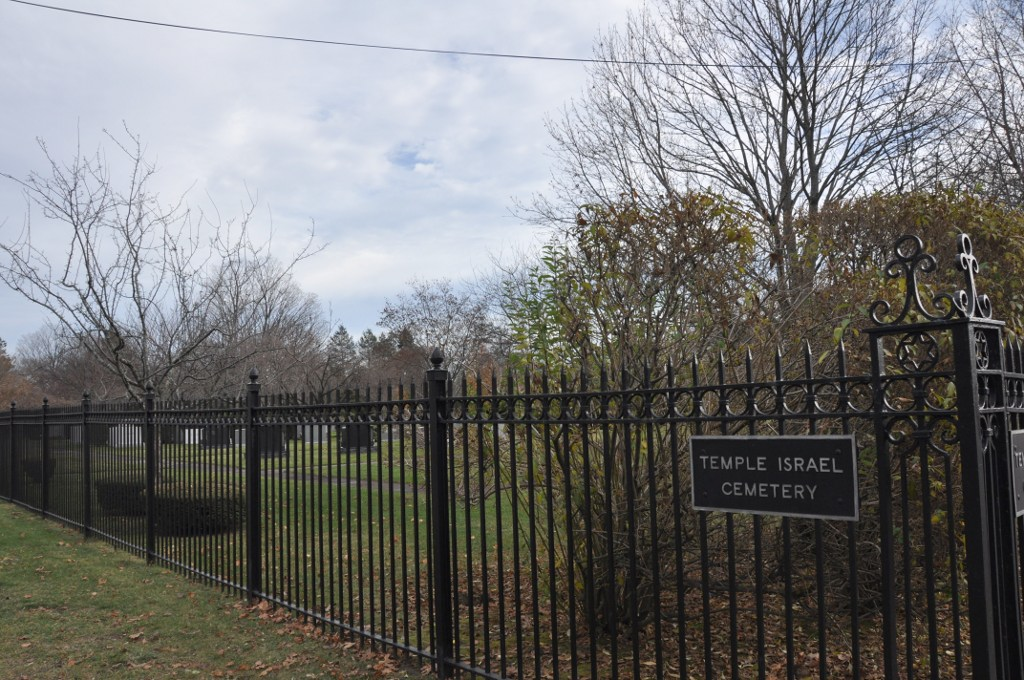

- Location within Massachusetts Location within the United States
- Location: Wakefield, Massachusetts
- Coordinates: 42°30′33″N 71°4′49″W
- MPS: Wakefield MRA
- NRHP reference No.: 89000753
- Added to NRHP: July 6, 1989

Temple Israel Cemetery is a historic Jewish cemetery on North Avenue in Wakefield, Massachusetts. The cemetery was established by the Temple Israel congregation of Boston in 1859. Unlike the adjacent Lakeside Cemetery, whose landscape is of winding paths, this cemetery is laid out in a rectilinear grid. Stones are somewhat uniform in their content, often listing places of birth and death. Markers placed early in the cemetery's history are predominantly marble, while many of those placed in the 20th century are granite or limestone. The cemetery's most notable burial is that of Rabbi Joshua Liebman.

The cemetery was listed on the National Register of Historic Places in 1989.

== See also ==
- National Register of Historic Places listings in Wakefield, Massachusetts
- National Register of Historic Places listings in Middlesex County, Massachusetts
