= Temple Israel (Boston) =

Reform synagogue in Boston, Massachusetts

- Hebrew: קק עדת ישראל
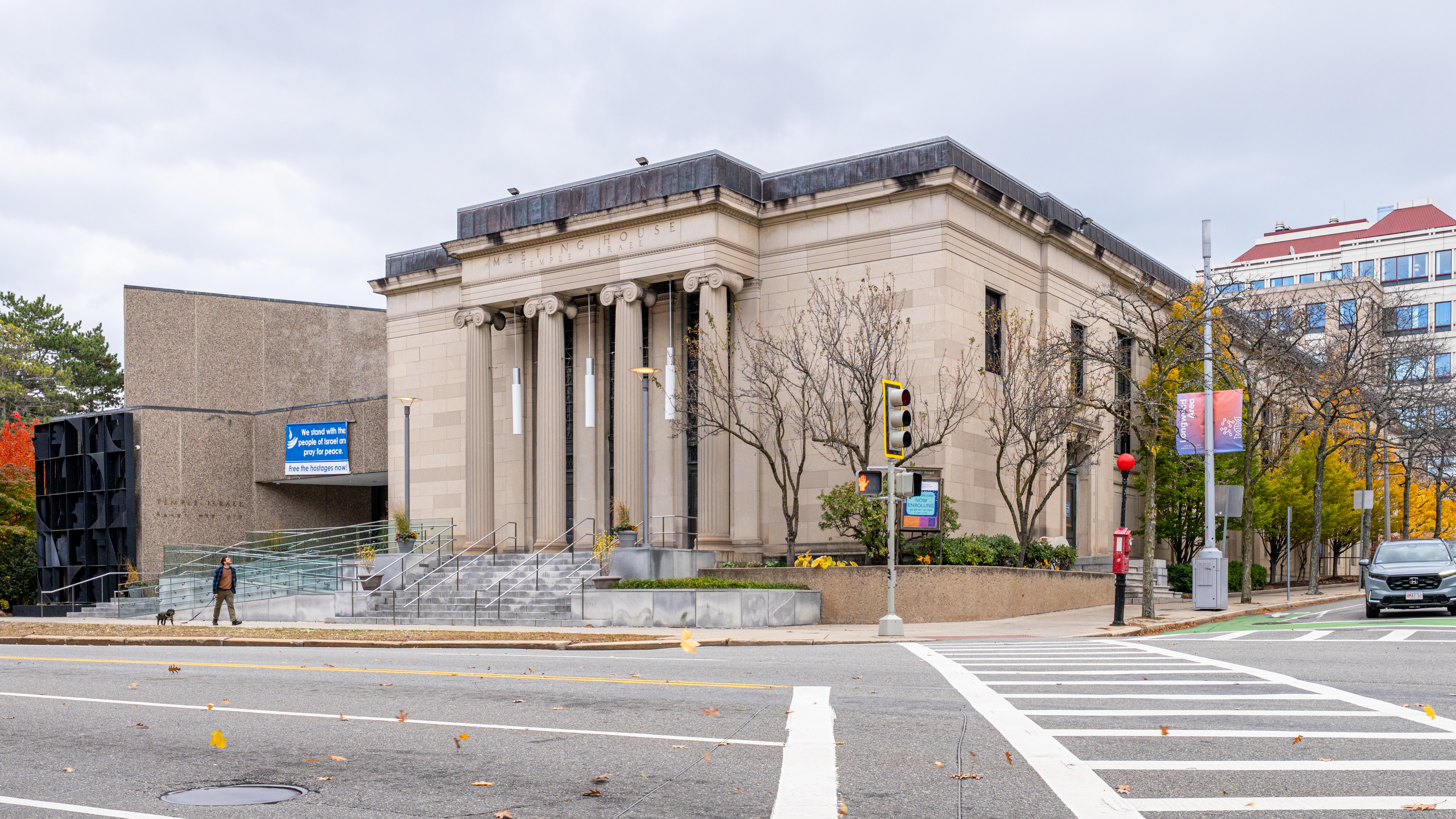

- Location in Boston

Religion
- Affiliation: Reform Judaism
- Ecclesiastical or organizational status: Synagogue
- Leadership: Rabbi Elaine Zecher
- Status: Active
- Notable artworks: Louise Nevelson sculpture

Location
- Location: 477 Longwood Avenue, Boston
- State: Massachusetts
- Country: United States
- Interactive map of Temple Israel
- Coordinates: 42°20′25″N 71°06′33″W

Architecture
- Architects: Weissbein & Jones (1885); Clarence Blackall (1906)
- Type: Synagogue
- Style: Rundbogenstil (1885); Exotic Revival (1906); Neoclassical (1926); Brutalist (1973)
- Established: 1854 (as a congregation)
- Completed: 1885 (Columbus Ave.); 1906 (Commonwealth Ave.); 1926 (Longwood Ave.); 1973 (Longwood Ave.)

Website
- tisrael.org

Temple Israel (Hebrew: קק עדת ישראל) is a synagogue affiliated with Reform Judaism in Boston, Massachusetts, United States. Founded in 1854 as Adath Israel, the congregation is the largest Reform synagogue in New England.

== History ==
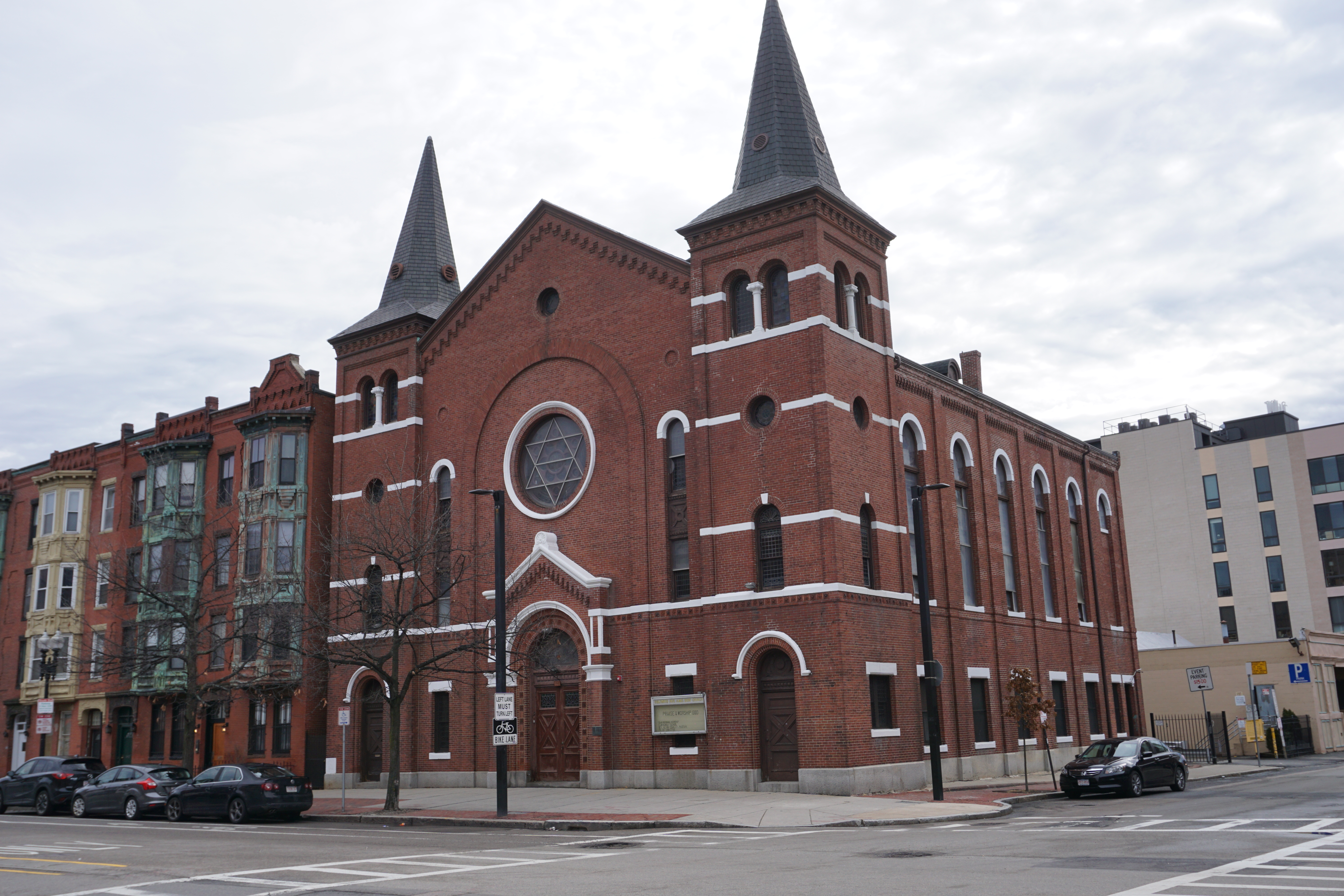
600 Columbus Ave. (1885–1906)

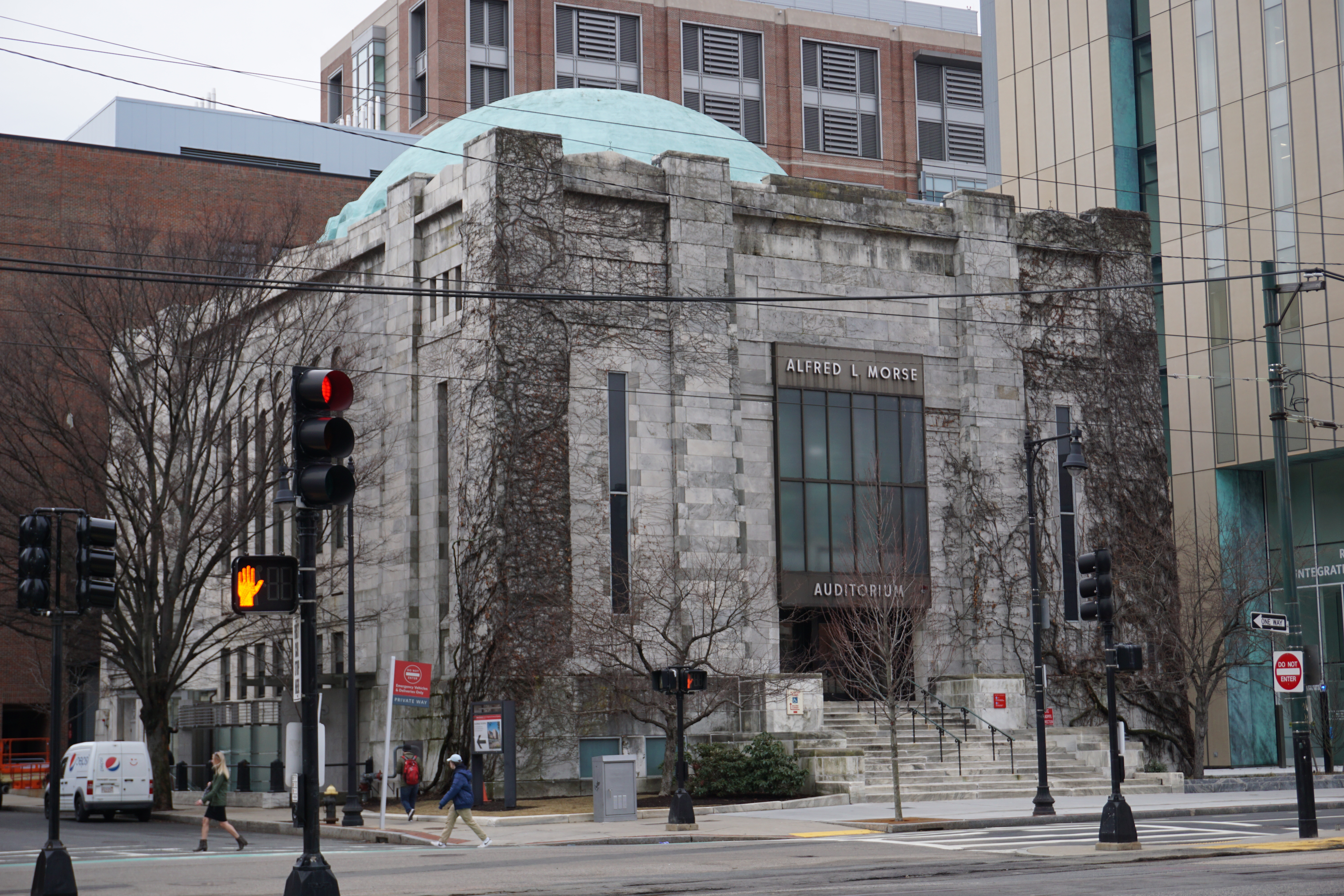
602 Commonwealth Ave. (1906–1926)

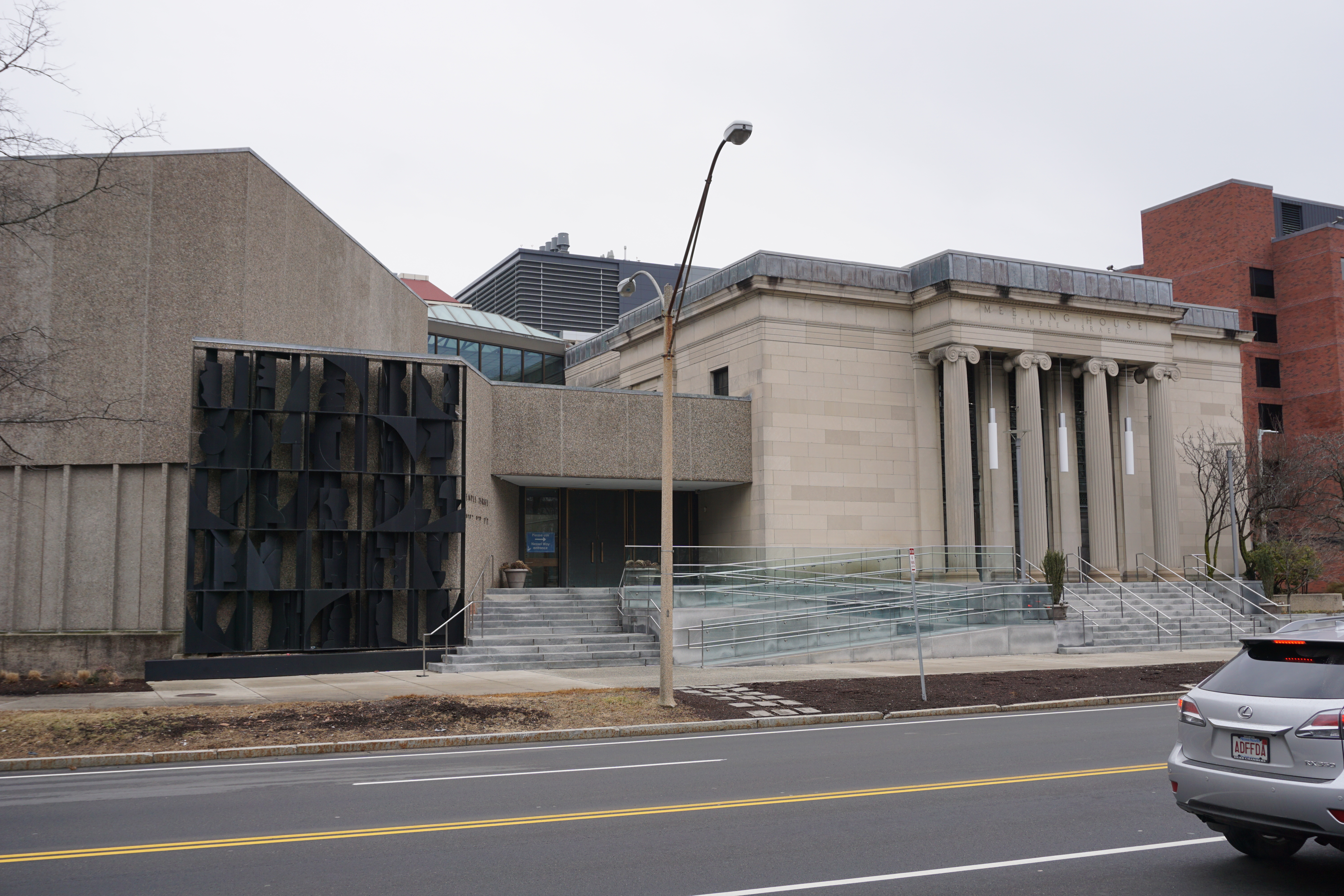
477 Longwood Ave. (1926–present)

The congregation Temple Israel, originally known as Adath Israel, was founded in 1854 when Jews of German ancestry seceded from Ohabei Shalom, then the sole synagogue in Boston, because so many Polish Jews had joined the congregation. The congregation immediately renovated a house on Pleasant Street for use as a synagogue. The congregation purchased land in Wakefield in 1859 for a cemetery. The Columbus Avenue synagogue building, designed by architects Weissbein & Jones, was dedicated in 1885 and was indicative of the growing size and wealth of congregation, and the influence of its members and leaders. The Auxiliary Society was founded in 1894, the first internal temple organization dedicated to social service, cultural activity, education, and social functions.

The Commonwealth Avenue Temple, designed by Clarence Blackall, was dedicated in 1907. Rabbi Harry Levi, who served as rabbi from 1911 to 1939, led to changes within the religious school by implementing new policies such as paying teachers, establishing branch schools, and refocusing the curriculum on more traditional Jewish subjects. He officiated at the first congregational Seder, held in 1913. Abram Vossen Goodman stated, "For the first time we liberal Jews indicated that we wanted to participate in old Pesach traditions with our own version." This seder was the first to follow the Reform-sponsored Union Haggadah. Rabbi Levi commenced radio broadcasts of sermons in 1924, which led to his being known as the "Radio Rabbi."

With his installation in 1954, Rabbi Gittelsohn—the first Jewish chaplain of the United States Marine Corps—brought a new commitment to social action to Temple Israel during his tenure. During his time as the rabbi of Temple Israel, the congregation started the Boston Ruleville Interfaith Committee (BRIC) in 1959. In April 1965, during a visit to Boston, Martin Luther King Jr. visited Temple Israel and spoke at their Passover event.

Murray Simon was installed as the Temple's first cantor in 1972 and in the following year, a new sanctuary was completed as part of the expanded Riverway campus, with a commissioned sculpture by Louise Nevelson, called Sky Covenant, placed at the synagogue's entrance.

In 2004 the congregation celebrated its 150th anniversary, and after Massachusetts became the first U. S. state to legalize gay marriage, gay marriage ceremonies were held at the synagogue.

Rabbi Elaine Zecher was elected as the senior rabbi of the congregation in 2016, the first woman to hold that post. She succeeded Rabbi Ronne Friedman, who had become the senior rabbi in 1999, who had in turn succeeded Rabbi Bernard Mehlman. The first female cantor was appointed in 2020: Alicia Stillman succeeded Roy Einhorn, who became emeritus after 27 years.

== Community life ==
=== Tikkun Central ===
Tikkun Central is the umbrella for all justice and compassion activities at Temple Israel, whether directed inward toward the Temple Israel community or outward towards the larger communities within which Temple Israel resides.

=== Religious School (Pre-K through 7) ===
Temple Israel offers a supplemental education program with classes for Pre-K through 7th graders.

== On-site resources ==
=== Temple Israel Archives ===
Temple Israel is the second-oldest congregation in the Boston area, and the largest Reform congregation in New England. Founded in 1854 in Boston, its long history follows the rise of the local Jewish community. The Temple Israel Archives serves as the repository for records, documents, publications, and images relating to the history and administration of Temple Adath Israel of Boston. These records document the congregational history and provide primary source material to assist the clergy, staff, and members of the synagogue. The Archives also serve as a resource for researchers who are interested in the history of Boston's Jewish community, or in family research.

=== Wyner Museum ===
The Wyner Museum was established in 1980 and houses the Temple Israel Judaica collection.

=== Dr. Arnold L. Segel Library Center ===
The library, named in memory of Temple member Dr. Arnold L. Segel, has over 20,000 books, audio- and visual-recordings, books on CD, journals and newspapers on Jewish subjects ranging from Bible to Zohar (mystical text). Temple Israel members, students, and staff may borrow materials from the library. The library is open to the public for reading and research on site. The librarian, who has over 25 years of experience, and her staff are available to help with individual research projects, and can help you find resources on any topic from just about any location, physical or virtual. The library is a member of the Massachusetts Library System's Inter-Library Loan program.

== Rabbinical leaders ==
The following individuals have served as senior rabbis of the congregation:

| Ordinal | Name | Years | Notes |
|---|---|---|---|
| 1 | Joseph Sachs | 1854–1856 | |
| 2 | Joseph Shoninger | 1856–1874 | Served as hazan |
| 3 | Solomon Schindler | 1874–1894 | |
| 4 | Charles Fleischer | 1894–1911 | |
| 5 | Harry Levi | 1911–1939 | |
| 6 | Joshua L. Liebman | 1936–1948 | |
| 7 | Abraham J. Klausner | 1949–1953 | |
| 8 | Roland B. Gittelsohn | 1953–1977 | Emeritus: 1977–1995 |
| 9 | Bernard H. Mehlman | 1977–1999 | Emeritus: 1999–present |
| 10 | Ronne Friedman | 1999–2016 | Emeritus: 2016–present |
| 11 | Elaine Zecher | 2016–present | |

== Architecture ==
In 1884–1885, the congregation erected the oldest purpose-built synagogue that remains standing in Massachusetts. The Rundbogenstil-styled building, with twin towers and a rose window in the form of a Magen David, stands at 600 Columbus Avenue, at the corner of Northampton. Today, it is the African Methodist Episcopal Zion Church.

In 1906, the congregation moved to a new building that is now the Morse Auditorium of Boston University.

In 1926, the congregation began work on a new temple, on the Riverway at Longwood Avenue in Roxbury, just across the Muddy River from Brookline. The "monumental" Neoclassical building was designed as an enormous domed sanctuary with flanking wings. Only the west wing, about one-fifth of the planned space, was completed before the stock market crash of 1929. The auditorium and religious school on Longwood Avenue were supplemented by a new modernist sanctuary in 1973.

== See also ==
- History of the Jews in the United States
- List of the oldest synagogues in the United States
- Sites of interest in Boston
