= Colonial Theatre (Pittsfield, Massachusetts) =

Theater and movie theater in Pittsfield, Massachusetts, U.S.

Coordinates: 42°26′46.29″N 73°15′14.20″W

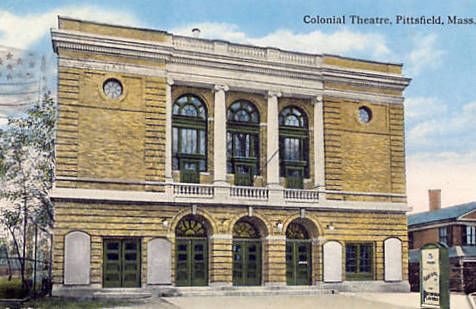
Colonial Theatre circa 1918

The Colonial Theatre is located at 111 South Street, Pittsfield, Massachusetts, in the Berkshire Mountains of western Massachusetts. Built in 1903, the theater was host to many theater greats including George M. Cohan, Sara Bernhardt, John Barrymore, Eubie Blake, Douglas Fairbanks Sr., Billie Burke, John Philip Sousa and the Ziegfeld Follies.

The theater was designed by Pittsfield architect Joseph McArthur Vance along with J.B. McElfatrick. Its ornate turn-of-the 20th century interior has been well preserved by its various owners.

Although the theater was closed in 1951, its grandeur had been protected through the years by George Miller and his son, Steven. Miller preserved many features of the Colonial during its conversion from a theater to the Miller's Art Supply Store, making it possible to eventually restore the theater back to its earlier grandeur, a process documented in photographer Nicholas Whitman's The Colonial Theatre: A Pittsfield Resurrection.

The Colonial Theatre was named by First Lady Hillary Clinton as a National Historic Treasure in 1998. She later visited the theatre as a U.S. Senator in 2000.

Following this announcement, the community invested more than $22 million to refurbish the 100-year-old Colonial Theatre, one of the only theaters of its kind from the Vaudeville age, described as "one of the finest acoustical theaters in the world."

The Colonial Theatre Restoration completed work in 2006 and it is now open to the public.

Many notable performers have since performed here, including James Taylor, the Lovin' Spoonful, and other musical and theater acts.
