= Berkshire Life Insurance Company Building =

- U.S. National Register of Historic Places
- U.S. Historic district – Contributing property
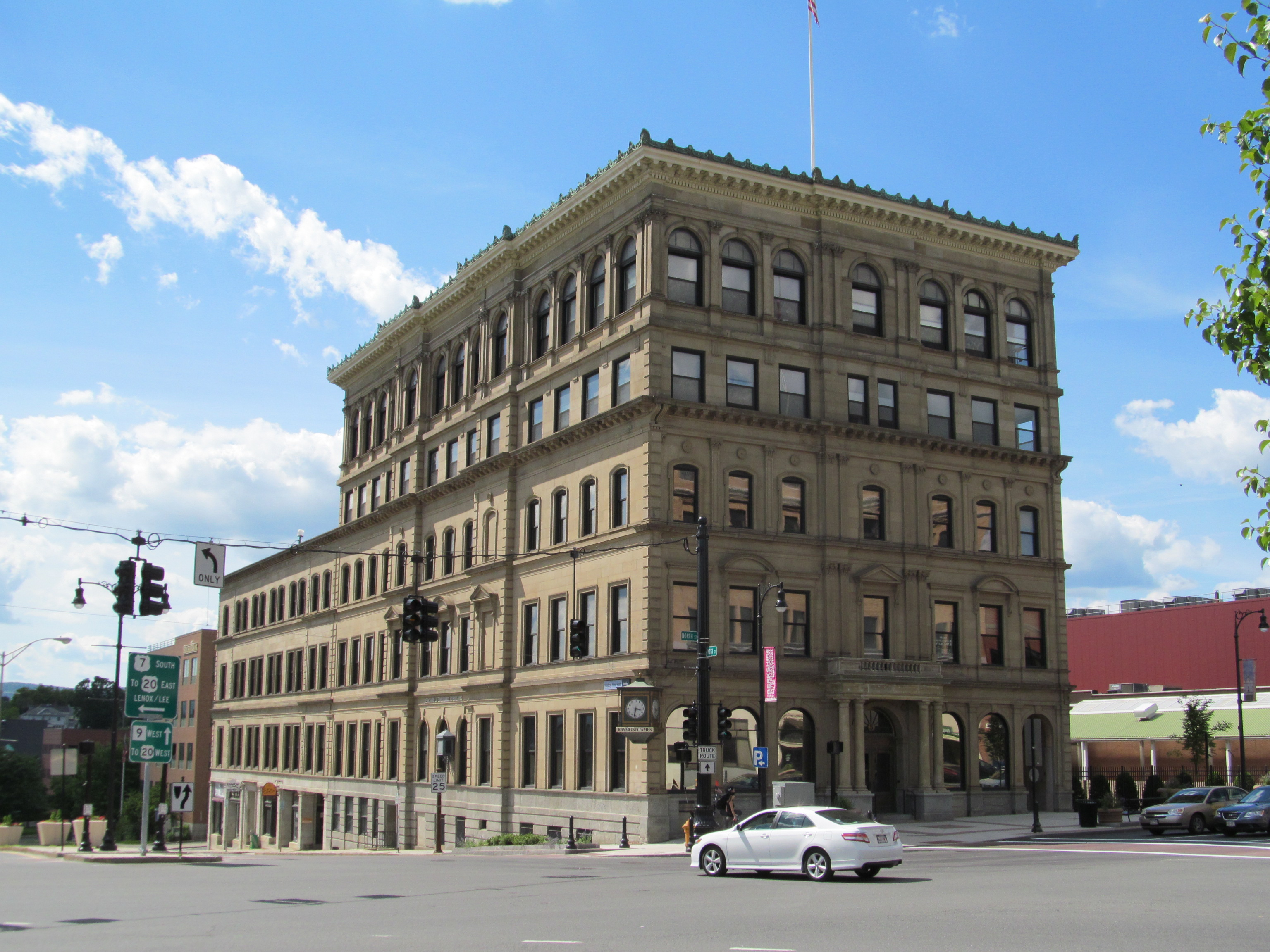

- Location within Massachusetts Location within the United States
- Location: Pittsfield, Massachusetts
- Coordinates: 42°26′56″N 73°15′18″W
- Built: 1868
- Architect: Louis Weissbein
- Architectural style: Renaissance
- Part of: Park Square Historic District (ID75001911)
- NRHP reference No.: 86000276

Significant dates
- Added to NRHP: February 27, 1986
- Designated CP: December 23, 1991

Berkshire Life Insurance Company Building is a historic commercial building at 5-7 North Street in Pittsfield, Massachusetts. It is located in the heart of downtown Pittsfield, facing Park Square across North Street. Built in 1868, it is one of a trio of Second Empire buildings designed by Louis Weisbsein, a Boston architect, whose style influenced later construction in the city. The building was listed on the National Register of Historic Places in 1986, and was included in an expansion of Pittsfield's Park Square Historic District in 1991.

== Description and history ==
The Berkshire Life Insurance Company Building stands at the northwest corner of Park Square, in the heart of downtown Pittsfield, at the corner of North and West Streets. It is a five-story masonry structure, built out of Nova Scotia freestone. Its main facade faces east, and is seven bays wide, with the main building entrance at the center bay, sheltered by a portico supported by clustered columns and topped by a low balustrade. The other first-floor bays have round-arch openings, the rightmost one housing a store entrance. Windows are set by floor in rectangular, segmented-arch, and round-arch windows, with a variety of topping elements. There is a modillioned cornice above the third floor (the building's original roofline), and another at the top.

The building was built in 1868 to house the headquarters of the Berkshire Life Insurance Company. It was designed by Boston architect Louis Weissbein, who also designed the nearby County Courthouse and House of Correction. All three buildings originally featured mansard roofs, and were influential on subsequent architecture in downtown Pittsfield.

The building was extended westward in 1906, in work designed by Pittsfield architect Henry Seaver. In 1911 the mansard roof was removed and replaced by two additional stories, to plans by Joseph McArthur Vance. The building's interior was extensively damaged by fire in 1970.

== See also ==
- National Register of Historic Places listings in Berkshire County, Massachusetts
