= Morse Auditorium =

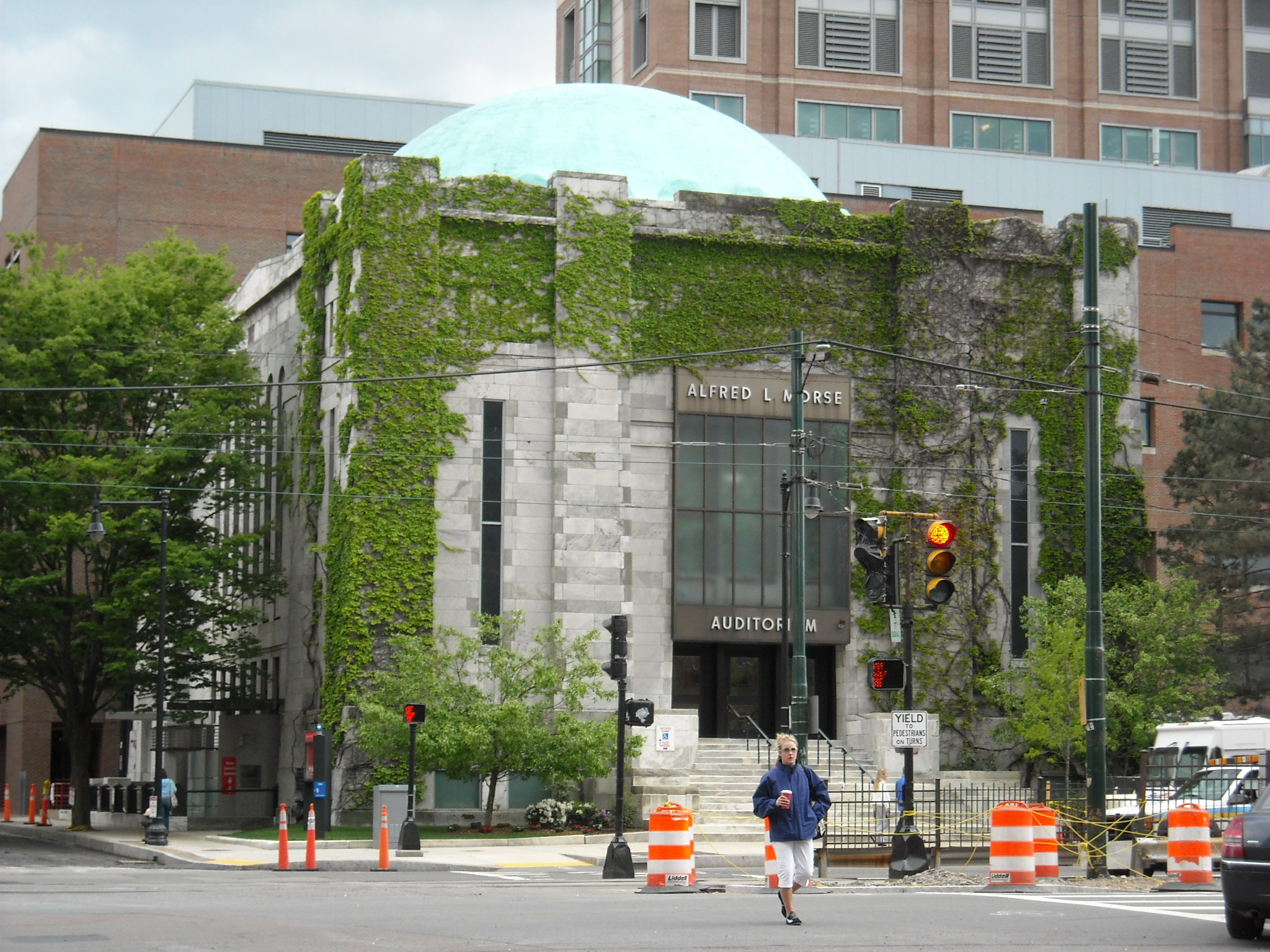
- The former synagogue, now auditorium, in 2008

- Location in Boston, Massachusetts

Religion
- Affiliation: Judaism (former)
- Ecclesiastical or organizational status: Synagogue (1906–1967); Auditorium (since 1971)
- Ownership: Boston University

Location
- Location: Boston, Massachusetts
- Country: United States
- Interactive map of Morse Auditorium
- Coordinates: 42°20′56″N 71°06′03″W

Architecture
- Completed: 1906
- Dome: One

The Morse Auditorium, officially the Alfred L. Morse Auditorium, is a domed theater that was built as a Jewish synagogue, that is now owned by Boston University and used as an auditorium.

Built in 1906 as Temple Israel, the edifice was intended by the architect and congregation as a replica of Solomon's Temple. Boston University acquired the building in 1967 when the congregation moved. In 1971, the building was named in honor of BU benefactor Alfred L. Morse, who was a member of the BU Board of Trustees from 1968 to 1973. The building is currently used for large lectures, events, and talks.

The building is clad in white marble and today much of it is covered in vine. It was intended by the architect and congregation to be a replica of the Temple of Solomon.

The building is adjacent to the Physics Research Building (PRB), Metcalf Science Center (SCI), and the Boston University College of Communication (COM).
