= Mahaiwe Block =

- U.S. National Register of Historic Places
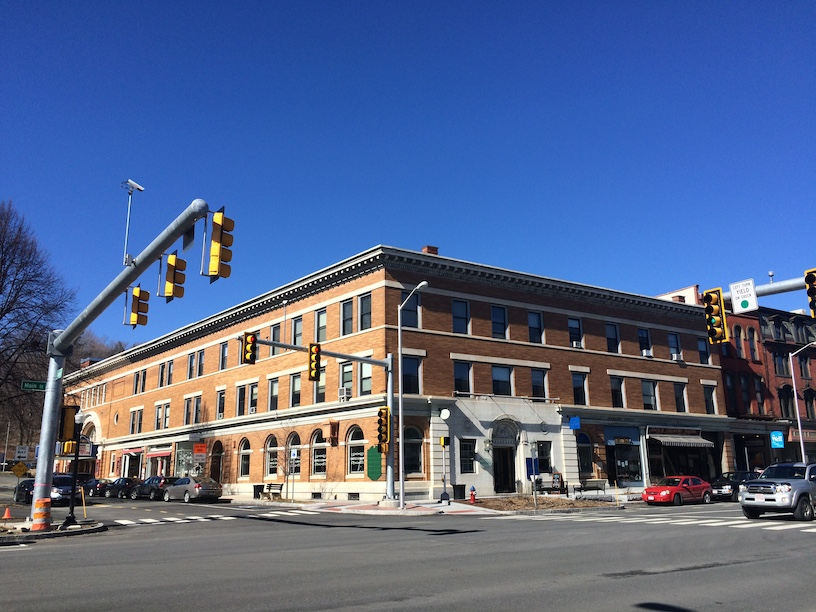

- Location within Massachusetts Location within the United States
- Location: Main & Castle Sts., Great Barrington, Massachusetts
- Coordinates: 42°11′38″N 73°21′46″W
- Area: less than one acre
- Built: 1905
- NRHP reference No.: 08000898
- Added to NRHP: September 12, 2008

The Mahaiwe Block is a commercial and theater building in the heart of downtown Great Barrington, Massachusetts. In addition to smaller businesses, it houses the Mahaiwe Performing Arts Center, the town's only major performance space. It has been in virtually continuous operation since its construction in 1905. The building is located at 6-14 Castle St. and 314-322 Main St, and is listed on the National Register of Historic Places.

The building's condition and fate in the 1990s was a major contributing factor in the establishment of local preservation ordinances. The building takes its name from an earlier structure on the site, which its owner called "Mahaiwe House".

== History ==
The Performance Center opened in September 1905 as a vaudeville house, it became a movie theater in the mid 1920s. The last company that showed first run films there, the Hoyts Theater chain, sold it to the Berkshire Opera Company and today shows classic films.

== Architecture ==
The Mahaiwe Block is a roughly rectangular three-storey building, presenting long facades to both Main and Castle Streets. Its exterior is finished in pale brick, with marble trim elements and a pressed metal entablature. White marble belt courses separate the floors. The Main Street facade includes two storefronts and an Art Deco building entrance, the product of a 1929 remodeling by a banking tenant. The Castle Street facade has a row of round-arch windows, three commercial storefronts, and the main entrance to the theater. The theater entrance has three sets of double doors, set in a large two-story round-arch opening, which is sheltered by the theater's 1930 marquee. The marquee is supported by chains and has a scrolled top. The street-facing portion of the marquee bears the theater's name in illuminated letters, a detail repeated in compressed form on the sides, above the panels showing the facility's current offerings.

== See also ==
- Great Barrington Station
- National Register of Historic Places listings in Berkshire County, Massachusetts
