= Old Town Hall (Pittsfield, Massachusetts) =

- U.S. National Register of Historic Places
- U.S. Historic district – Contributing property
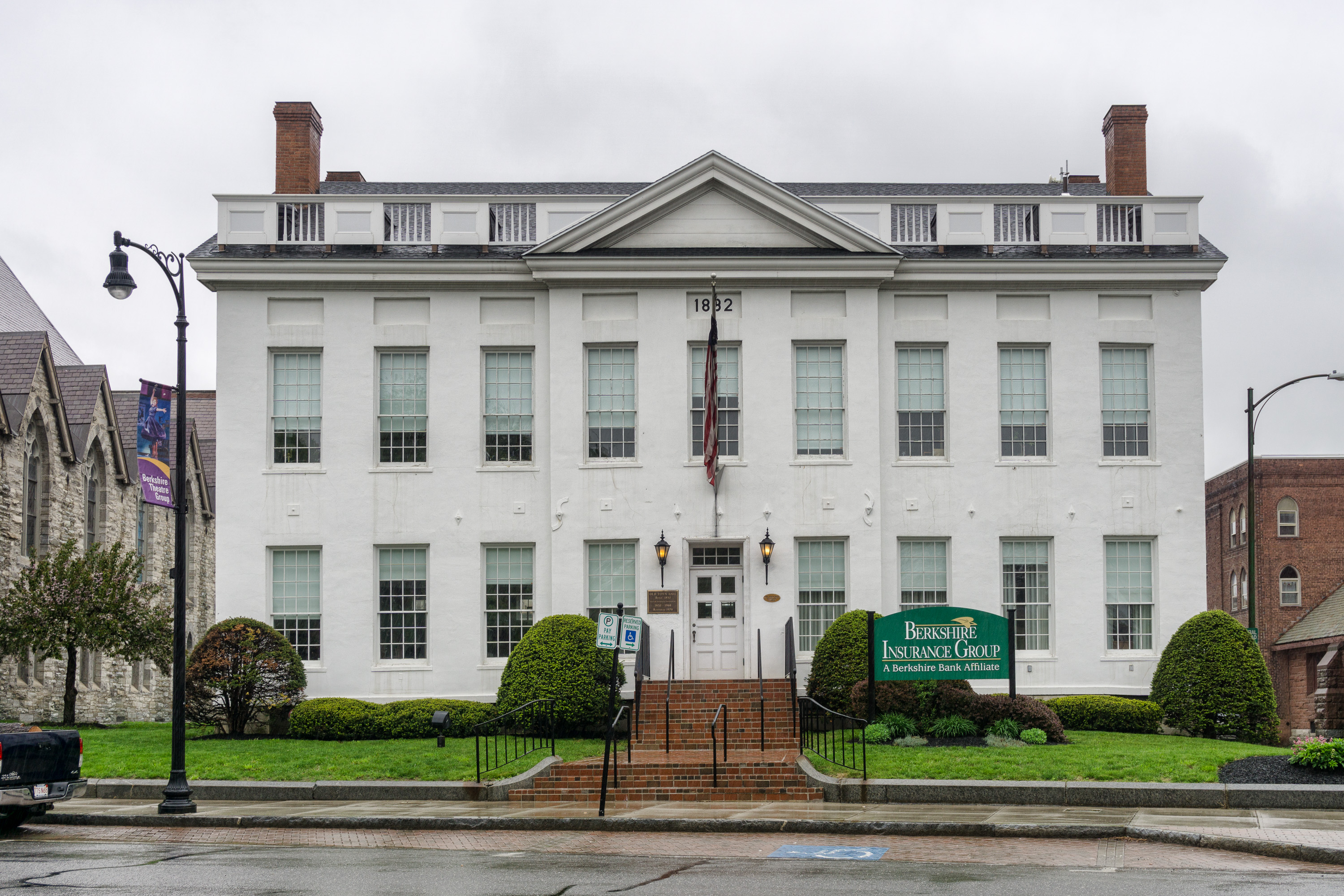

- Location within Massachusetts Location within the United States
- Location: 32 East Street, Pittsfield, Massachusetts
- Coordinates: 42°26′54″N 73°15′11″W
- Built: 1832
- Architectural style: Federal
- Part of: Park Square Historic District (ID75001911)
- NRHP reference No.: 72001299

Significant dates
- Added to NRHP: April 26, 1972
- Designated CP: July 24, 1975

The Old Town Hall is a historic building on Park Square in the heart of downtown Pittsfield, Massachusetts. This 1832 building served for 135 years as the center of municipal government. Built in the Federal style to serve as the town hall, it became City Hall when Pittsfield became a city in 1891, serving in that role until 1968. It is the city's oldest municipal building. The hall was listed on the National Register of Historic Places in 1972, and included in the Park Square Historic District in 1975.

== Description and history ==
Pittsfield's Old Town Hall is located on the north side of the city's Park Square, between the First Congregational Church and St. Stephen's Episcopal Church. It is a two-story masonry structure, built out of load-bearing brick that has been stuccoed and painted. It has a side-gable roof with a balustrade with alternating panels and baluster groups, and there is a slightly projecting center section on its front (south-facing) facade. This projecting section, three bays wide, is topped by a fully pedimented gable. Chimneys are located at the ends of the building. Windows are 16-over-12 sash, and the main entrance is topped by an eight-light transom.

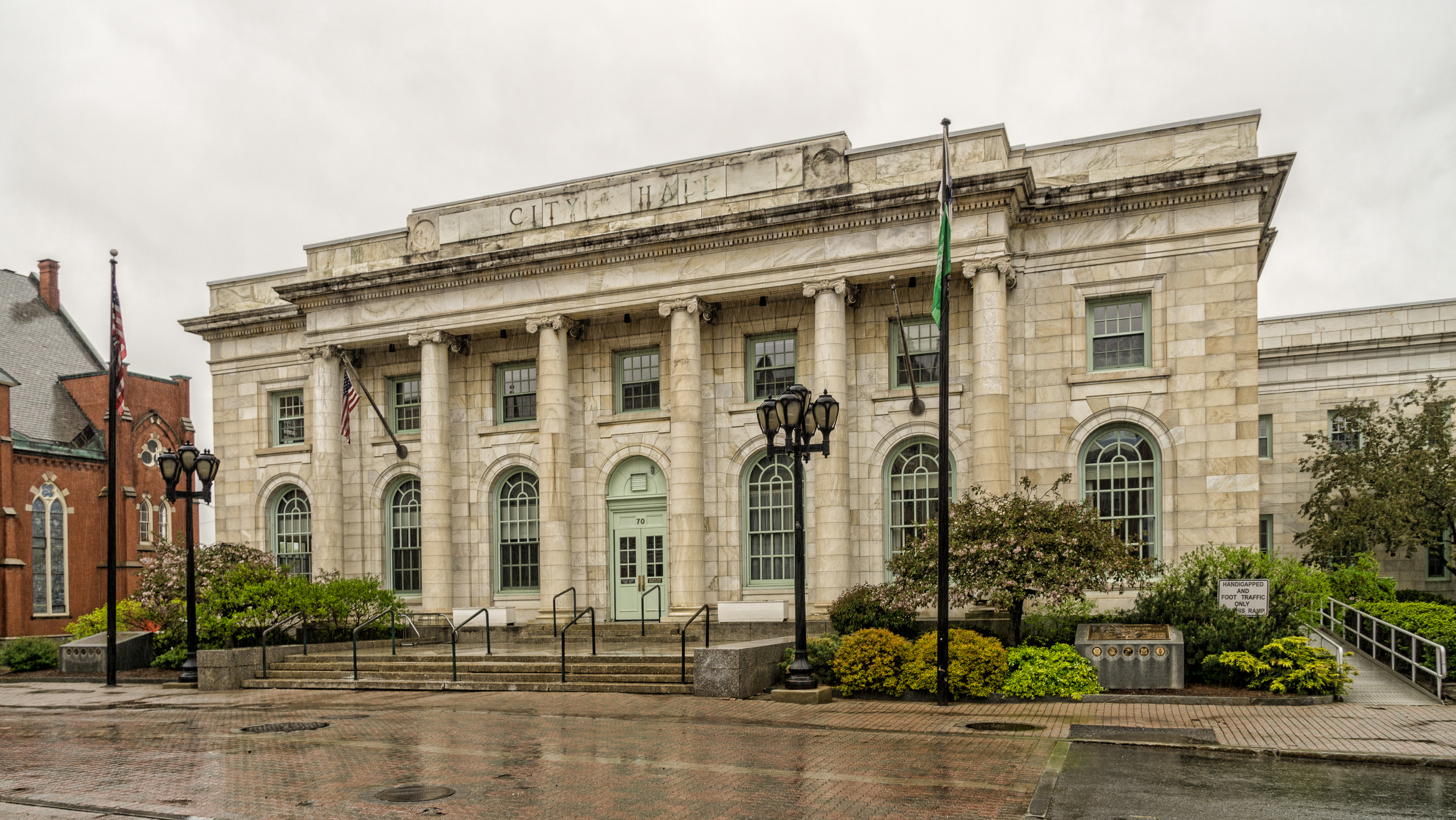
City hall moved to the former post office on Allen Street in 1968

The hall was built by the town in 1832, and served as town hall until 1891, when the town was rechartered as a city. It served as city hall until 1968, when city offices moved to their present facilities in the former post office on Allen Street. In addition to housing city offices, the building has also housed post office facilities, banks, and served briefly as the county courthouse. The building received a major addition in 1896, but this was removed when the city offices were moved to the current city hall in 1968, and the building was restored to its earlier Federal appearance. The building now houses professional offices.

== See also ==
- National Register of Historic Places listings in Berkshire County, Massachusetts
