= Springside Park =

- U.S. National Register of Historic Places
- U.S. Historic district
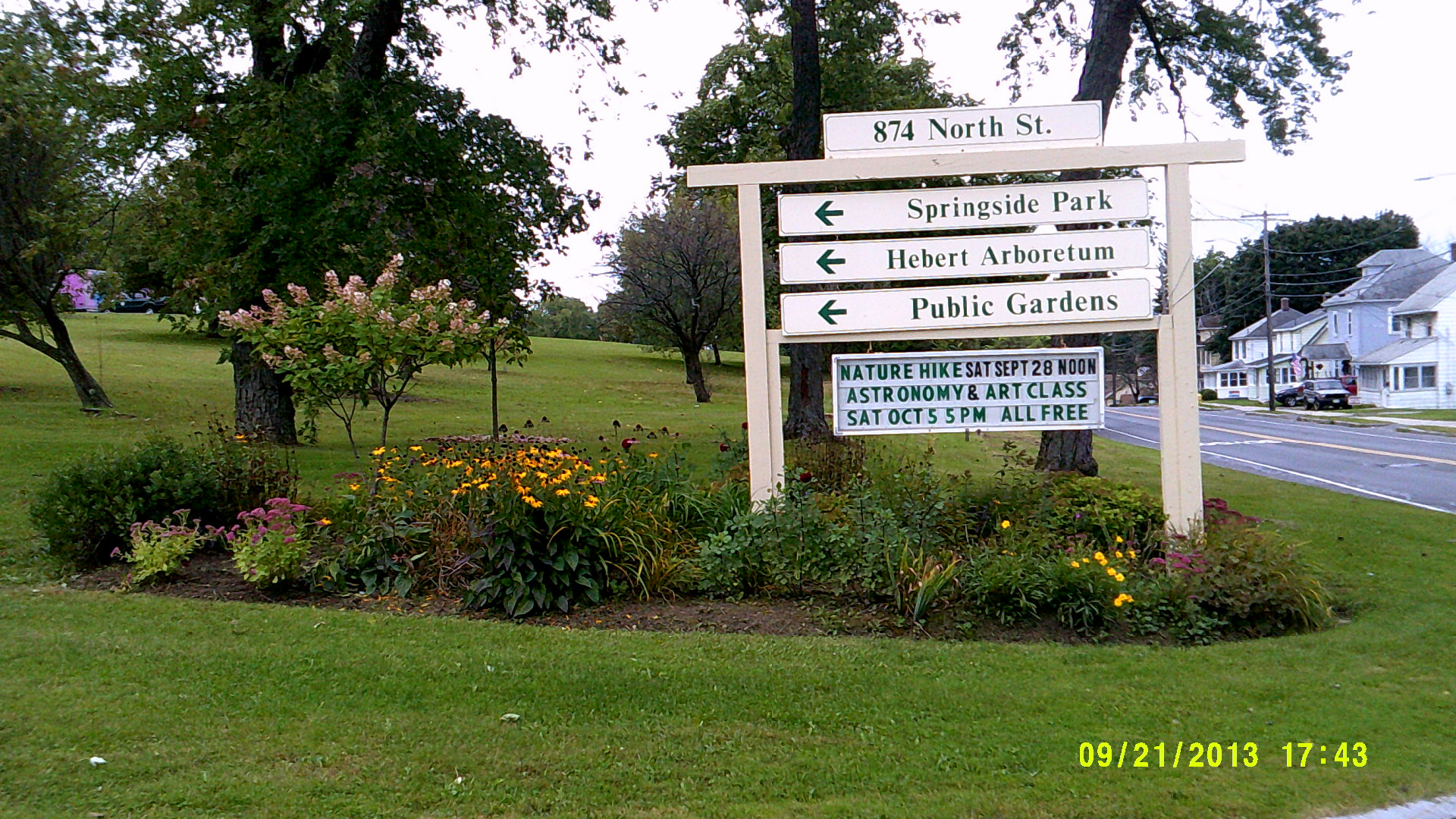
- Entrance sign

- Location within Massachusetts Location within the United States
- Location: Pittsfield, Massachusetts
- Coordinates: 42°28′17″N 73°14′40″W
- Area: 237.5 acres (96.1 ha)
- Built: c. 1856
- Architect: Joseph McArthur Vance; W. Ellingwood Allen
- Architectural style: Late Victorian; Gothic Revival
- NRHP reference No.: 08000553
- Added to NRHP: June 27, 2008

Springside Park is a recreational city park on the north side of Pittsfield, Massachusetts. At 237.5 acres (96.1 ha) it is the city's largest park. Much of the park is wooded, providing for passive recreational opportunities such as hiking. The southwestern section of the park, nearest to North Street, is developed, with ballfields, a bath house, pond, and Springside House, an Italianate mansion whose early construction dates to c. 1856. Some of the parklands are also used for the Hebert Arboretum. Through the 1960s the City of Pittsfield operated a ski rope tow and provided ski lessons at the park. The park was listed on the National Register of Historic Places in 2008.

== History ==
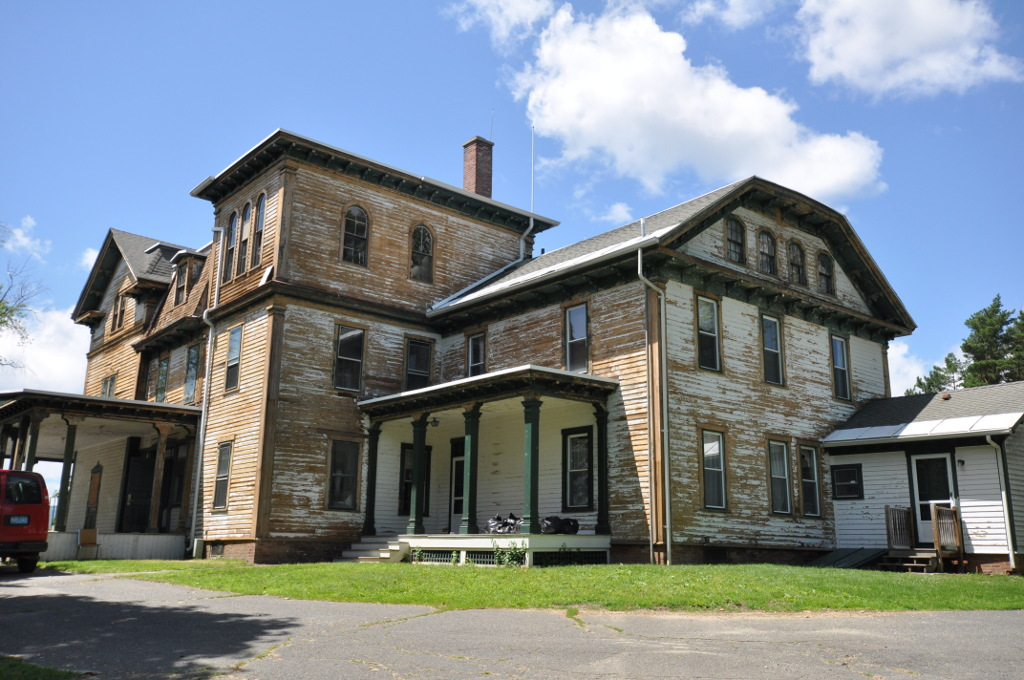
Springside House

In the early 19th century, the area that is now Springside Park was farmland, much of which belonged to the Strong family. In 1808, Asahel Strong sold water rights to springs on land that may now be in the park to the Pittsfield Water Works Company. Sometime in the late 1840s or early 1850s, Abraham Burbank established a gentleman's farm on land purchased from a Strong descendent. A portion of Burbank's land, including the house, was sold in the 1850s to a private boarding school operated by Charles Abbott. Around this time, Burbank apparently began construction on Elmhurst, the building that is now called Springside House. It was further enlarged in the 1870s by John Davol, a businessman who purchased Burbank's farm in 1872. It was acquired by Clarence Stephens in 1904, and became part of Springside Park in 1938.

The formation of the park was spearheaded by former mayor Kelton Miller, who began purchasing land near the Burbank/Davol/Stephens estate in 1908. He and his wife Eva donated 10 acres (4.0 ha) land south and east of the estate to the city in 1910, and continued to make land donations afterward. The Stephens estate was acquired by Miller's sons in 1938 and donated to the city, and the city also acquired from the William Alton Pierce family a 39-acre "cow pasture" on the north side of the estate the same year, making the park over 120 acres (49 ha) in size. Development of the park's infrastructure began in the years following this acquisition. The park was reduced in size when the nearby school was built, but the city compensated by making additional land acquisitions, eventually bringing the park to its present size.

== See also ==
- National Register of Historic Places listings in Berkshire County, Massachusetts
