= Park Square Historic District (Pittsfield, Massachusetts) =

Historic district in Massachusetts, United States

- U.S. National Register of Historic Places
- U.S. Historic district
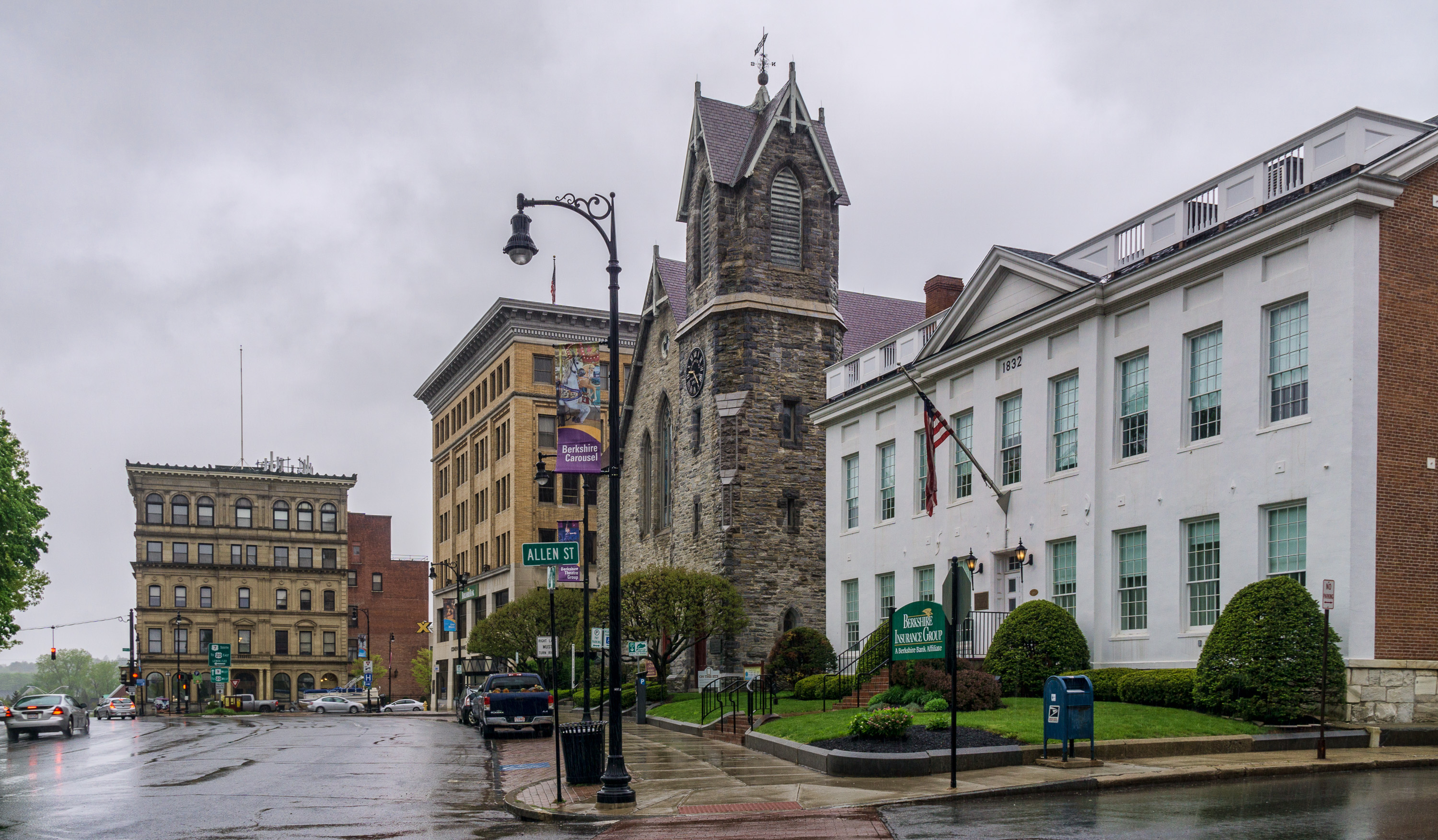
- Looking West along East Street, left to right: Berkshire Life Insurance Company Building, Berkshire County Savings Bank Building, First Church of Christ, Old Town Hall.

- Location within Massachusetts Location within the United States
- Location: Pittsfield, Massachusetts
- Coordinates: 42°26′54″N 73°15′12″W
- Area: 9 acres (3.6 ha) (original); 27.4 acres (11.1 ha) (after 1991 increase)
- Built: 1810
- Architect: Peabody & Stearns; Et al.
- Architectural style: Gothic Revival, Federal
- NRHP reference No.: 75001911 (original); 91001826 (increase)

Significant dates
- Added to NRHP: July 24, 1975
- Boundary increase: December 23, 1991

The Park Square Historic District is a historic district in Pittsfield, Massachusetts. The district is centered on the historic heart of Pittsfield encompassing a number city blocks adjacent to Park Square, which is at the junction of North, South, East, and West Streets.

When first listed on the National Register of Historic Places in 1975, the district encompassed the park and eight buildings that faced it, including the Old Town Hall, the county courthouse, the Berkshire Athenaeum, and the First Church of Christ. In December 1991, the boundaries were expanded to the area roughly bounded by East Housatonic, South, North and Fenn Streets, and Wendell Avenue, adding 39 buildings to the district. Notable buildings included in this extension include the present City Hall (a repurposed post office building), the Berkshire Life Insurance Company Building, the Allen Hotel, the Berkshire Museum of Art and Natural History, and the Masonic temple.

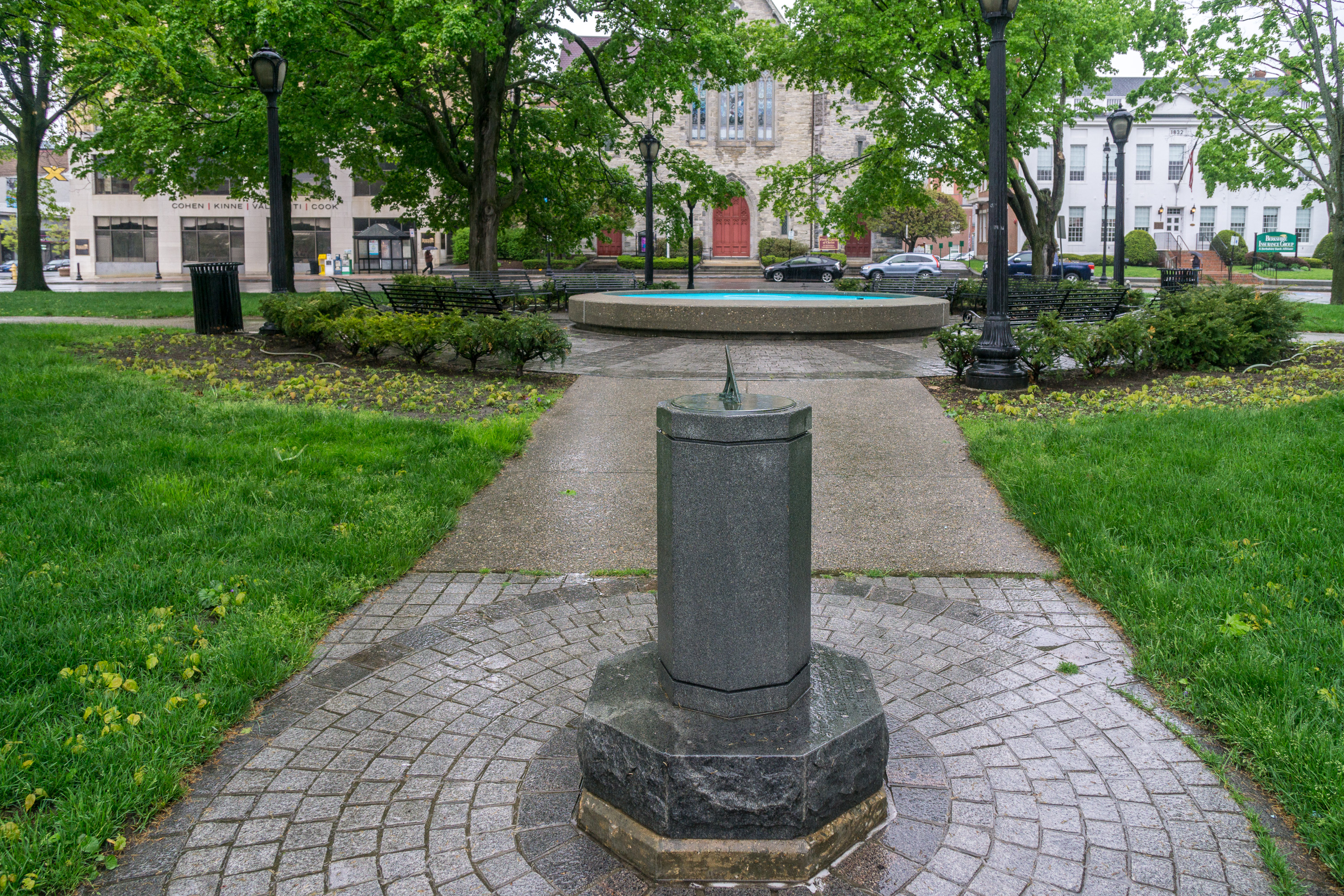
Park Square

Pittsfield was settled in the 1740s, and was incorporated as a proprietary settlement in 1753. It was given a town charter in 1761. Park Square, the heart of the city, was laid out in 1790 on land donated by John Chandler Williams. It was located near the town's first colonial meeting house, which was erected in 1762. The square was the site of the nation's first agricultural fair, held in 1810. In the first half of the 19th century, the community began to develop industrially, principally in the area of paper manufacturing. It became a regionally important hub due to its railroad connections in the mid-19th century, and became the shire town of Berkshire County in 1868, spurring further growth. The commercial districts around the square developed in the late 19th century as a result of this growth.

== See also ==
- National Register of Historic Places listings in Berkshire County, Massachusetts
