= Housatonic Congregational Church =

- U.S. National Register of Historic Places
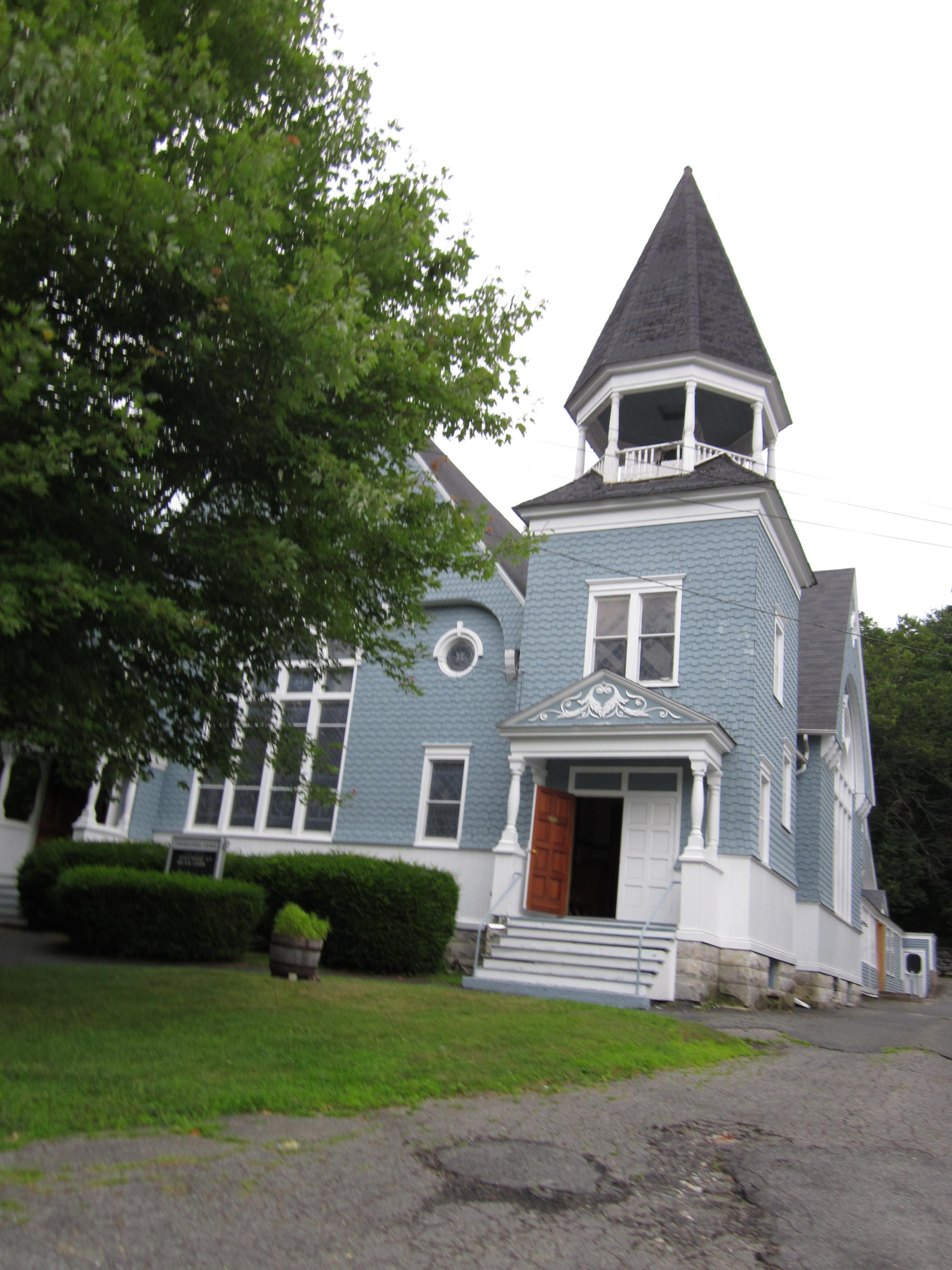

- Location within Massachusetts Location within the United States
- Location: 1089 Main St., Great Barrington, Massachusetts
- Coordinates: 42°15′29″N 73°21′56″W
- Area: less than one acre
- Architect: Harding & Seaver; Charles T. Rathbun; H. Neill Wilson
- Architectural style: Queen Anne, Colonial Revival
- NRHP reference No.: 02000377
- Added to NRHP: April 18, 2002

The Housatonic Congregational Church is a historic church building at 1089 Main Street in Great Barrington, Massachusetts. Built in 1892 it is a prominent local example of Queen Anne Revival architecture, and was listed on the National Register of Historic Places in 2002. It is now home to the Unitarian Universalist Meeting of South Berkshire.

== Architecture and building history ==
The former Housatonic Congregational Church is located in the village of Housatonic in northwestern Great Barrington, on the north side of Main Street between Depot and Front Streets. It is a basically cruciform 1 1/2-story wood-frame structure, with a gabled roof and exterior clad in wooden shingles. A tower stands in one of the inner corners of the cross, with a square base, and open octagonal belfry topped by an octagonal roof. The front-facing gable has a large arched stained-glass window. The main entrance is in the base of the tower, sheltered by a porch whose gable is decorated with a floral motif.

The church was built in 1892 to replace an earlier church, the first built for its original congregation in 1842. It was designed by H. Neill Wilson, who also designed a number of notable Pittsfield buildings. In 1902 a new parsonage replaced an earlier one which was purchased by the Monument Mills Company; it was sold in 1979 to provide funds for needed work on the church and the rest of the property. The sanctuary's stained glass windows were restored in 1978.

The church was bought by the Unitarian Universalist Meeting of South Berkshire in 2014.

== See also ==
- Ramsdell Public Library, next door
- National Register of Historic Places listings in Berkshire County, Massachusetts
