= Ramsdell Public Library =

- U.S. National Register of Historic Places
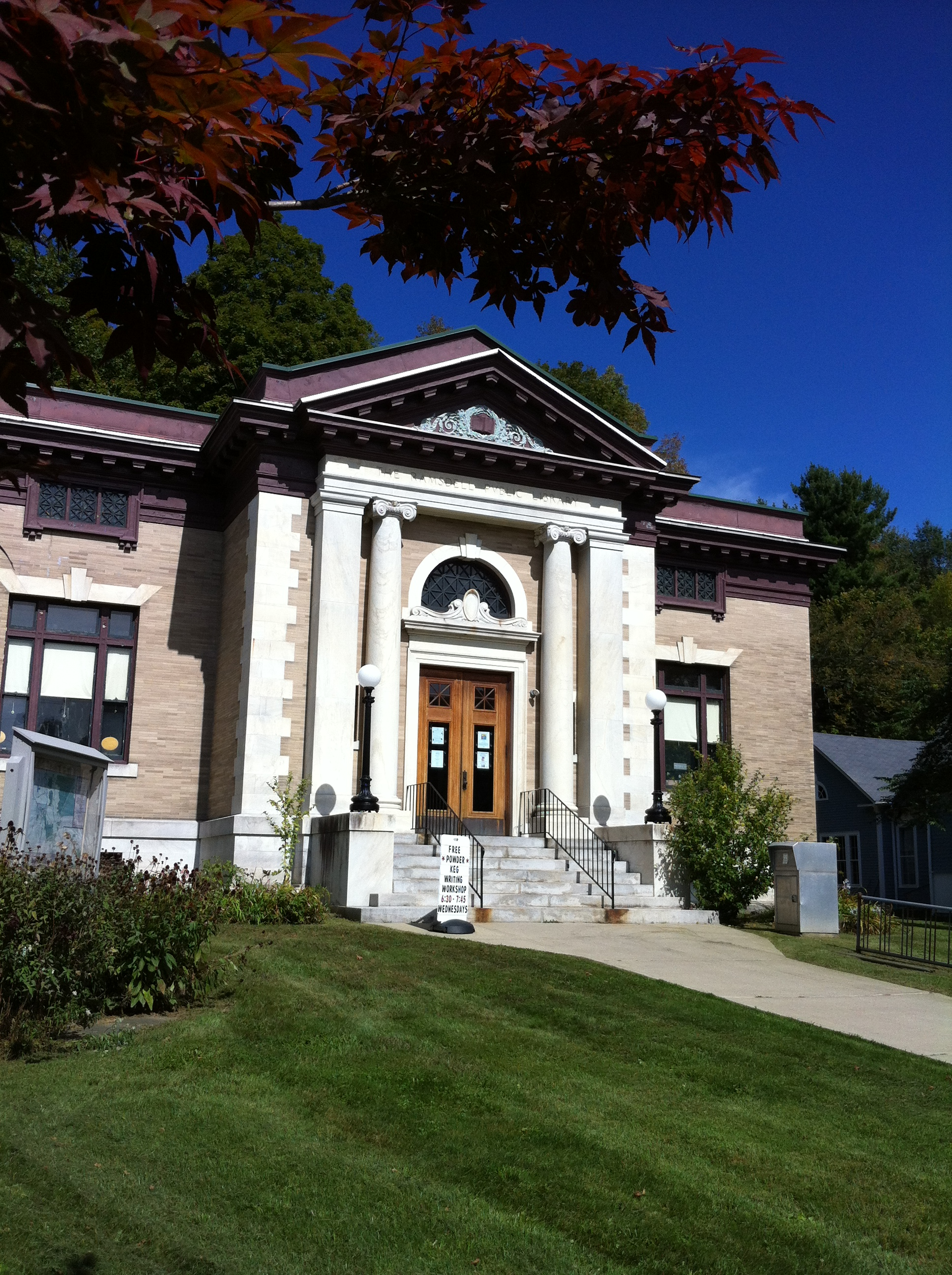
- Front of the library

- Location within Massachusetts Location within the United States
- Location: 1087 Main St., Great Barrington, Massachusetts
- Coordinates: 42°15′29″N 73°21′55″W
- Area: less than one acre
- Built: 1906
- Architect: McLean & Wright; Harding & Seaver
- NRHP reference No.: 14000440
- Added to NRHP: July 25, 2014

Ramsdell Public Library is one of two public library buildings of Great Barrington, Massachusetts. It is located at 1087 Main Street in the Housatonic village, in a two-story Beaux Arts building erected c. 1908. The building was a gift to the town by T. Ellis Ramsdell, fulfilling a bequest by his father Theodore, owner of the Monument Mills. It was designed by Boston architects McLean & Wright, with a sympathetic rear addition (added 1928–30) designed by the Pittsfield firm of Harding & Seaver. It was listed on the National Register of Historic Places in 2014.

The other branch of the Great Barrington library system is at 231 Main Street.

== Architecture and history ==
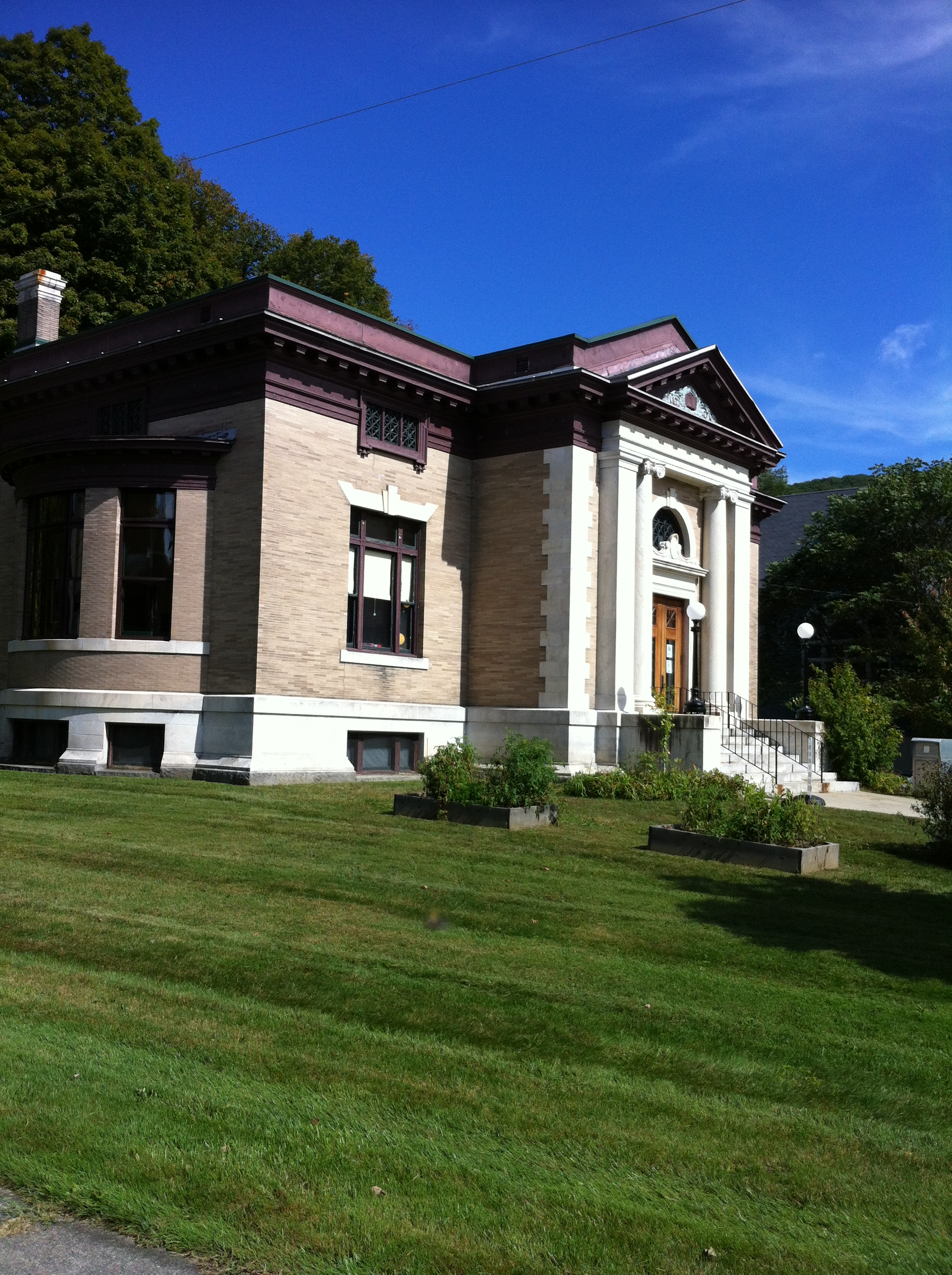
Angle view of the library

Ramsdell Public Library is located in Housatonic village, set between the Unitarian Universalist Meeting of South Berkshire, formerly the Housatonic Congregational Church, and the Corpus Christi Church on the north side of Main Street. The original 1908 main block is 1 1/2 stories in height, built out of yellow brick with marble trim. The main facade is three bays wide, with a projecting gabled entry pavilion at the center. The entry pavilion has marble corner quoins, and a further projection with an entablature and dentillated gable supported by pilasters and Ionic columns. The entrance has glass-paneled double doors, set in a recess framed by marble trim and topped by a sill with a foliated cartouche, and a half-round transom window. Windows on the ground floor are set in rectangular openings with splayed keystoned lintels; there are small windows beneath the eaves that illuminate the rooms of the half-story.

The interior begins with a tiled entry area, with stairs rising around the outer walls to a large meeting room that occupies most of the upper story. The entry opens into a central rotunda, with reading rooms on either side, and stacks and librarian area to the rear. The openings to these spaces are flanked by wooden columns finished in emulation of marble. Walls are plastered, with oak trim around the windows, doors, and fireplaces.

The rear addition nearly doubles the space of the building, extending behind the central and western portions of the main block. It provides for an enlarged reference area, more stacks, and a dedicated workroom for the library staff.

The building was designed by the Boston partnership of McLean & Wright, which apparently later adapted this design for the Shedd-Porter Memorial Library in Alstead, New Hampshire, and the Weeks Memorial Library in Lancaster, New Hampshire, both of which post-date this building by a few years. It is a particularly fine local example of Classical Revival architecture.

== See also ==
- National Register of Historic Places listings in Berkshire County, Massachusetts
