= Williams High School (Stockbridge, Massachusetts) =

Coordinates: 42°16′53.16″N 73°18′31.14″W

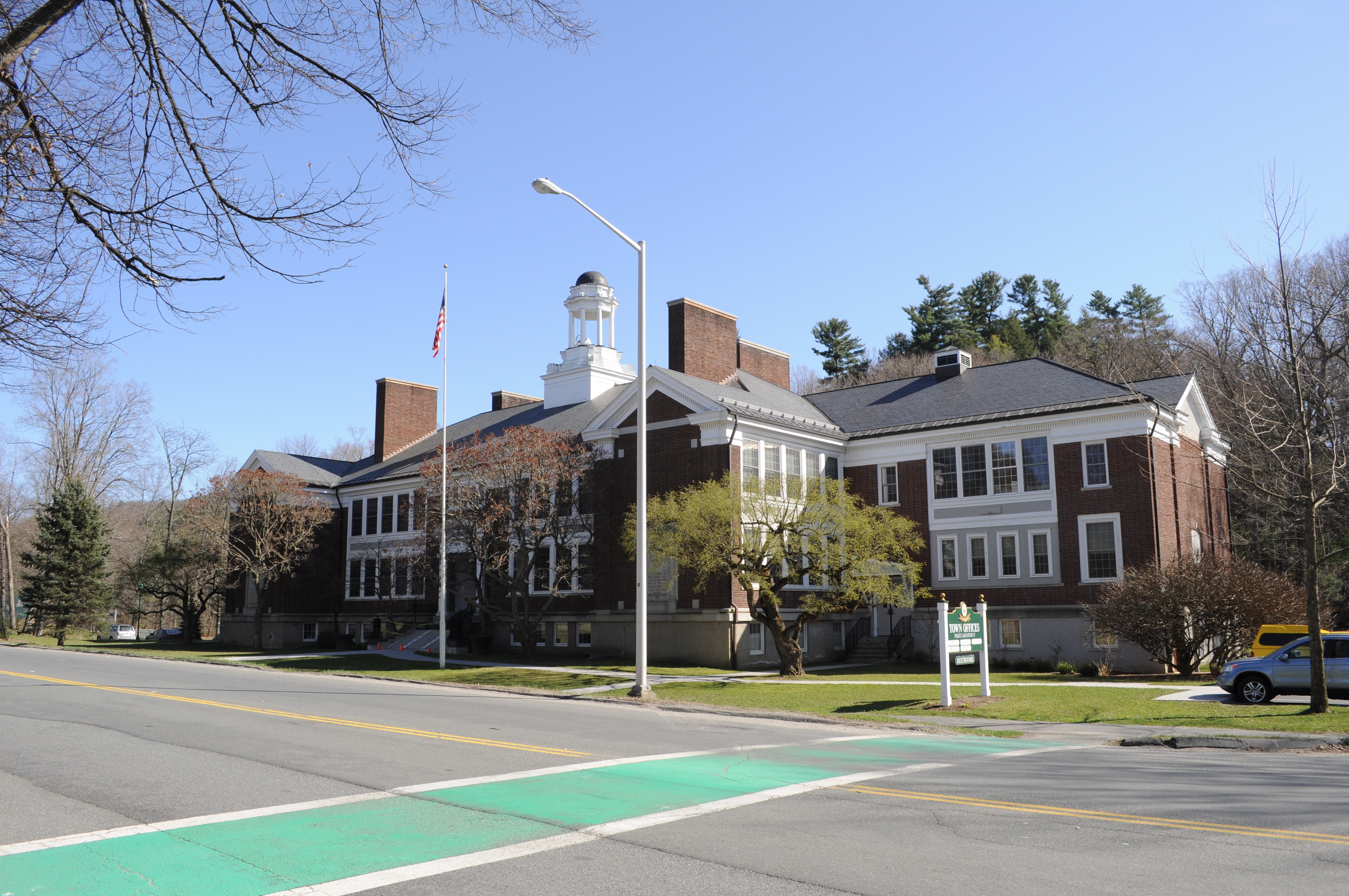
- Williams High School occupied the second and third floors of the 1914 school building now serving as the Town Offices

Location
- 50 Main Street; Stockbridge, Massachusetts 01262; U.S.

Information
- Type: public secondary school
- Established: 1872
- Status: closed 1968
- Grades: 9-12
- Gender: coeducational
- Campus: rural, small village
- Colors: green & gold
- Athletics: Southern Berkshire League
- Nickname: Indians
- Newspaper: Chieftain
- Yearbook: Konkapot

Williams High School was a public high school located in the town of Stockbridge in the Berkshire Hills of western Massachusetts. Its history evolved from the town's earliest schools founded before and shortly after the American Revolutionary War. Students from Stockbridge, its small villages of Interlaken, Glendale and Larrywaug, and from the nearby town of West Stockbridge attended Williams High School. In April 1968 the school closed, when its students transferred to a new regional high school located in the town of Great Barrington.

== History ==
The first school in Stockbridge was erected in 1737 under the supervision of John Sergeant, a missionary to the local Mohican Indians. It served as a school for the Christian education of Indian children. Through the pre-Revolutionary War years several small schools were opened to serve the children of newly arriving settlers scattered between the distant boundaries of adjoining towns. The founding of the semi-private Academy after the Revolutionary War marked the beginning of a more structured commitment to secondary education in the town. Three of the four students in the first graduating class of Williams College in 1795 were alumni of the Academy. The school's reputation attracted students from outside the area who boarded with local families. In 1829 the ‘Stockbridge Academy’ was incorporated and sometimes referred to as the ‘New Academy’.

In the early and mid-1800s Stockbridge schools earned the distinction of educating three Associate Justices of the Supreme Court of the United States who served on the high court at the same time. All educated in Stockbridge, Stephen Johnson Field, Henry Billings Brown and David Josiah Brewer served together as Associate Justices from 1891 to 1897.

=== Cyrus Williams ===
In 1841 Cyrus Williams, a physician, businessman and president of the Housatonic Bank in Stockbridge, donated $3000 to the Academy. The school was soon renamed the Williams Academy for its benefactor. Williams was born on March 22, 1767, in Groton, Connecticut. His parents were Daniel and Esther Avery Williams. He was married first to Fannie West and then to Sarah Huntington. Williams died on October 20. 1841. His friend, David Dudley Field named his sixth son Cyrus West Field, after Williams.

An inscription on a panel in the 1914 school building reads, In permanent gratitude to Cyrus Williams, a discerning citizen of this town, who, appreciated that knowledge is the only safeguard of free institutions, gave enduring reality to this belief by the endowment of our first public school.

=== Academy to public school transition ===
As public primary schools were built in Glendale in 1868 and Curtisville (Interlaken) in 1870, the Williams Academy continued its transition to full public status, and by the 1880s was known as the Williams Academy and Stockbridge High School. With the opening of a new building in April 1914, the name was changed to Williams High School. The evolution of schools in Stockbridge, from its first missionary school through various private and semi-private academies to a full public school system, paralleled the development of civic structures at the state and local levels over several hundred years.

== Student life ==
=== Academics ===
The school's curriculum had three tracks, business, college preparatory and agriculture. In addition to traditional business and college preparatory classes, there was a strong Future Farmers of America (FFA) chapter that attracted students from outside the district. The FFA program involved a curriculum centered around farming and animal husbandry. There was a chapter of the National Honor Society.

=== Extracurricular activities ===
Extracurricular activities involved several clubs, including French, Latin, Drama and Glee Clubs. There had also been a School Orchestra and a Rifle Club. There was a student council and each class elected officers. Representatives from the student body traveled to the state capitol in Boston and participated in the annual Boys and Girls State program.

Student groups worked on the Chieftain newspaper and Konkapot yearbook. The Konkapot was named in honor of Chief Konkapot, a leader of the local Mohican Indians in the early and mid-1700s. Students produced two literary magazines, first the Green and Gold and later the Scribbler.

=== Athletics ===
School colors were green and gold. Early in its history Stockbridge was sometimes referred to as 'Indian Town'. The attachment to that heritage is reflected in the names of the newspaper and yearbook, as well as the school's athletic teams, the ‘Indians’. Boys varsity sports included soccer, basketball, skiing, baseball, cross country and golf. Girls sports included basketball and field hockey. Also, there was a cheerleading team. The school's arch rival was Searles High School in Great Barrington, with other important rivalries involving high schools in the towns of Lenox and Lee.

== Regionalization debate ==
A statewide emphasis on school regionalization, begun in the early 1950s, was designed to create economies of scale for rural communities faced with increasing costs of maintaining their own schools. In 1956 Stockbridge began regionalization discussions with several neighboring towns including Lenox, Lee, West Stockbridge and Great Barrington. For several years the idea was very contentious in all the communities. Votes in 1959 and 1960 could not find consensus on consolidation. In January 1960, Lenox and West Stockbridge voters approved a plan that failed in Stockbridge by three votes.

=== Stockbridge works to save its high school ===
In September 1963 Stockbridge voters overwhelming decided, by a 298 to 55 majority, to build a new facility for Williams High School. A site was chosen in fields below the Naumkeag estate north of the town center on land controlled by The Trustees of Reservations. The town successfully challenged opposition by the Trustees in the Massachusetts Supreme Court. However, efforts to maintain a high school in Stockbridge ended when the state refused to provide the necessary funds to support the effort.

=== Regionalization approved ===
After Lenox and Lee finally chose not to regionalize and maintain their own schools, Stockbridge, West Stockbridge and Great Barrington went to the polls again and approved a plan to enter into a consolidated Berkshire Hills Regional School District. Planning began for their primary and secondary schools to be located on adjoining campuses in Great Barrington. The district offices would be located in Stockbridge. The regionalization agreement united longtime rivals Williams High School and Searles High School into one student body. For the first time in nearly two and a half centuries, since John Sergeant founded an Indian mission school in 1737, the children of Stockbridge would not be attending school in their own community.

== School closure ==
The last class to graduate from Williams High School was in June 1967. The graduation ceremony was held at Tanglewood, as had many of the school's graduation ceremonies over the years. The last student to receive a Williams High School diploma was John Gennari, president of the Class of 1967. The school did not actually close until April 1968, when the senior and junior classes moved to the newly completed Monument Mountain Regional High School in Great Barrington. Helping to manage the closure and transition was Henry L. O'Connor, the last principal to lead Williams High School. Pressure from the state, economies of scale for rural districts and fluctuating student populations had forced the closure of its high school, an outcome Stockbridge resisted for over a decade.

=== 1914 school building ===
The three-story brick school building opened in 1914 and located at 50 Main Street had been shared by Williams High School and the town's primary school known as 'Stockbridge Plain School'. Over the next fifty years several additions were made to the structure. This would be the final home for both schools. Following their closure, the building was remodeled and opened in 2008 as the Stockbridge town offices. Additionally, the building provides space for the police department, regional school district administration and a community gymnasium.

== Alma Mater (song) ==
Oh fling out old Williams banner, flash its green upon the breeze, let its gold gleam in the sunshine, high above the smiling trees. For we love our Alma Mater, and her honored Green and Gold, and our hearts will e’er be loyal to old Williams as of old.

So let the green then wave in triumph, let the gold flash in the sun, as a bold and brave defiance, that her loyal sons are one. Though the years may fade her colors, fleck the green and dull the gold, yet our hearts will e’er be loyal to old Williams as of old.

Thomas Malumphy, Class of 1917

== Alumni & archives ==
School alumni hold an all class reunion every September, publish an annual newsletter and maintain a scholarship fund for students from Stockbridge and West Stockbridge. The archives of Williams High School are collected and preserved at The Stockbridge Library, Museum & Archives. Access is available on request.

=== Williams High School Directory, 1872-1968 ===
The Williams High School Directory, 1872-1968 is a school history, listing of graduates, faculty and administration and collection of photographs. The Directory provides an account of the village's schools from 1737 through 1968. A comprehensive listing identifies graduates, faculty and administrators from 1872 through 1968. Thirty-three photographs and images are included. The Directory was published in 1984 by the Williams High School Alumni Association.

The address of the Williams High School Alumni Association is PO Box 916, Stockbridge, MA 01262-0916.
