= Glendale, Massachusetts =

Village in Massachusetts, United States

Coordinates: 42.283°N 73.344°W

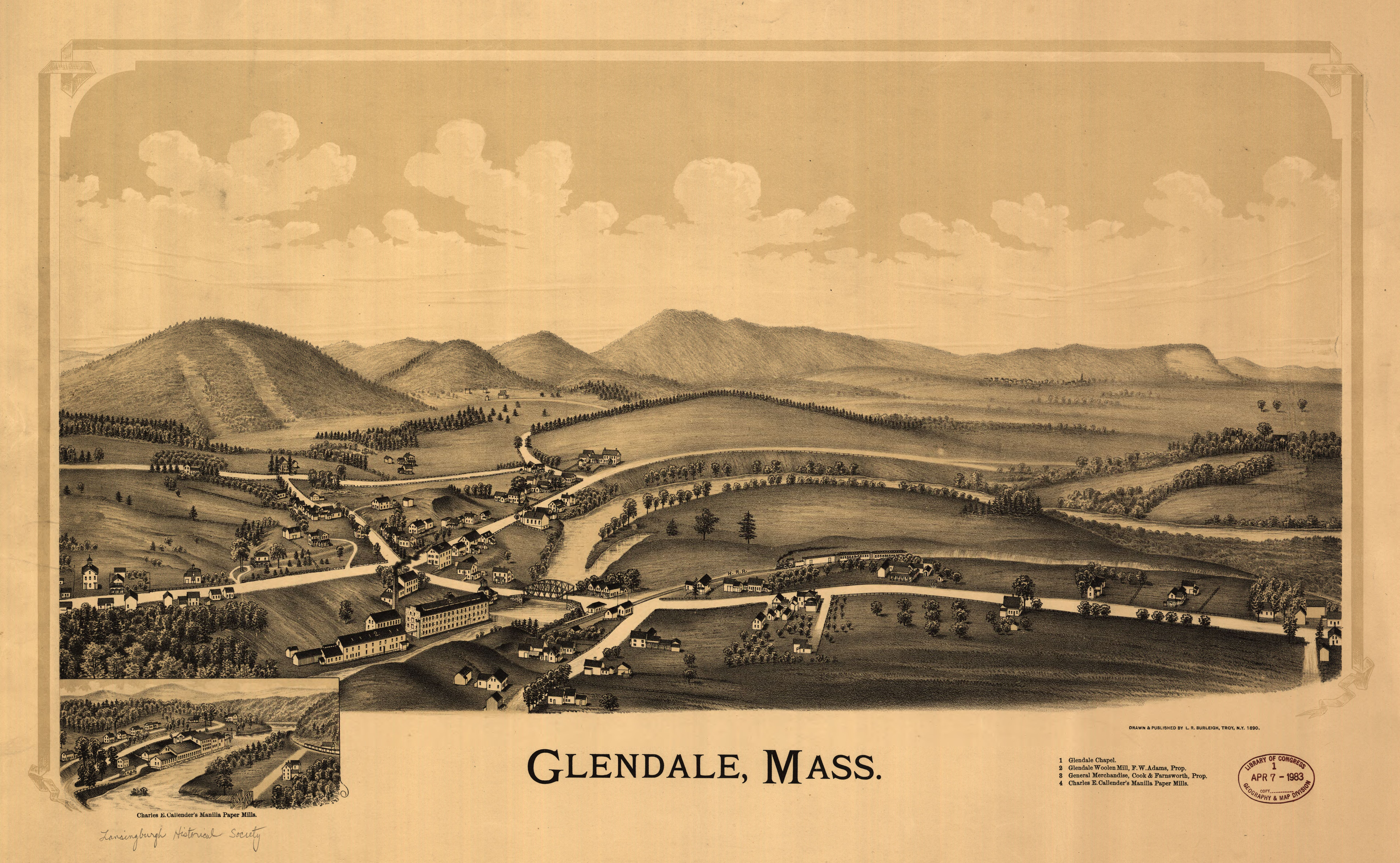
Perspective map of Glendale from 1880 with list of landmarks and inset image of Charles E. Callender's Manilla Paper Mill by L.R. Burleigh

Glendale is a village in Berkshire County, Massachusetts, United States. It is near Stockbridge, Massachusetts. Glendale is located along the Housatonic River. It has a post office.

Glendale was once an important center of institutions of private and public education. Russell Webb attended Glendale Home School.

In 1904, Glendale Elastic Fabric Company had plans to install new looms at its plant along the river.

Charles Callender established a paper manufacturing plant in Glendale.

Chesterwood is in Glendale at 4 Williamsville Road.

== See also ==
- Glendale Power House
