= Saint Andrew's Chapel (Washington, Massachusetts) =

- U.S. National Register of Historic Places
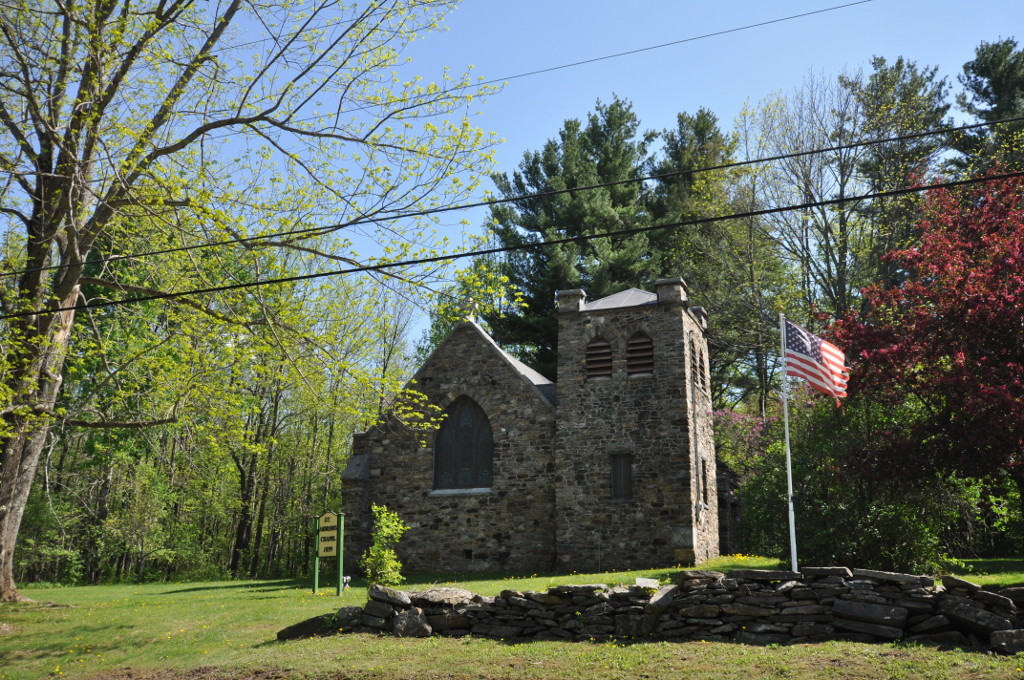

- Location within Massachusetts Location within the United States
- Location: Washington Mtn. Rd., Washington, Massachusetts
- Coordinates: 42°21′27″N 73°7′58″W
- Area: less than one acre
- Built: 1899
- Architect: George C. Harding
- Architectural style: Late Gothic Revival
- MPS: Washington MRA
- NRHP reference No.: 86002142
- Added to NRHP: September 12, 1986

Saint Andrew's Chapel is a historic chapel on Washington Mountain Road in Washington, Massachusetts. Built in 1899, the stone Gothic Revival structure is the rural community's finest example of late 19th-century architecture. It was built as a gift of George Crane, and was built next to his estate, Bucksteep Manor. The chapel was listed on the National Register of Historic Places in 1986.

== Description and history ==
Saint Andrew's Chapel is located in a rural setting in central Washington, on the east side of Washington Mountain Road south of its junction with Frost Road. It is a single-story masonry structure, built out of randomly coursed local fieldstone and covered by a slate roof. It is basically cruciform in shape, with a square tower project to the side of the street-facing gable end. The sides of the nave are reinforced by buttresses, and the tower is capped by a low hip roof with posts at the corners. A three-part stained-glass window is set in the gable end, depicting Saint Andrew in the center with stylized flowers in the flanking windows.

The chapel was designed by Pittsfield architect George C. Harding and was completed in 1899. Harding was then in the early stages of his career, which would include a wide variety of public buildings across New England. The church was built for George Crane, a wealthy New Yorker who summered at the adjacent estate. Services were only held in the chapel when the Cranes were in residence, and ownership of the chapel and Crane's estate eventually passed to the Episcopal diocese. The chapel was donated to the town of Washington in 1977, and continues to be used as a religious facility.

== See also ==
- National Register of Historic Places listings in Berkshire County, Massachusetts
