= Charles T. Rathbun =

American architect

Charles Theodore Rathbun
- Born: February 2, 1828; Pittsfield, Massachusetts
- Died: July 22, 1908 (aged 80); Pittsfield, Massachusetts
- Occupation: Architect
- Practice: C. T. Rathbun; Rathbun & Harding

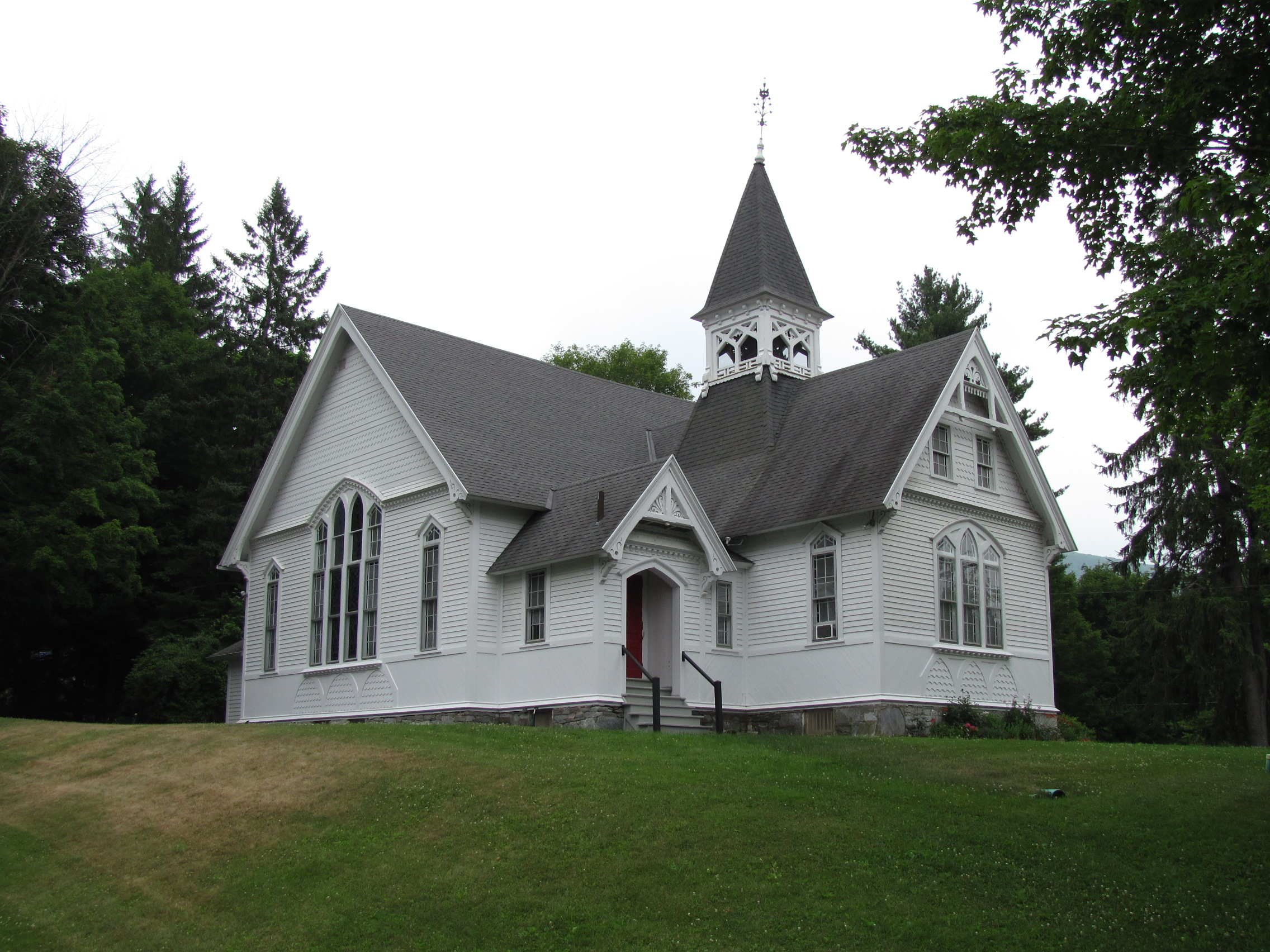
Congregational Church, West Stockbridge, 1881

Charles T. Rathbun was an American architect who practiced in Pittsfield, Massachusetts, during the second half of the nineteenth century.

== Life and career ==
Rathbun was born in Pittsfield in 1828. His early life is unknown, but it is probable that he first trained as a carpenter. In the 1850s he went to New York, where he worked for ecclesiastical architect John W. Priest. Priest is known to have worked in the Pittsfield area, possibly explaining the connection. He had returned to Pittsfield by January 1858, a year before Priest's death. At that time he established himself as an architect, practicing alone. He worked as such until 1894, when he established a partnership with George C. Harding, Rathbun & Harding. The two remained together until 1899, when Rathbun retired. At this time, he was noted as probably being the oldest architect in Berkshire County. Harding practiced alone until 1901, when he established the notable local firm of Harding & Seaver.

On February 14, 1848, Rathbun married Mary Sharp in Pittsfield. He died there on July 22, 1908.

== Legacy ==
As least two buildings designed by Rathbun have been individually placed on the National Register of Historic Places, and several others contribute to listed historic districts.

== Architectural works ==
Year	Building	Address	City	State	Notes	Image	Reference
1865	First Congregational Church	906 Main St	Williamstown	Massachusetts	Completely rebuilt in 1913.		
1868	Farm complex	Massachusetts Agricultural College	Amherst	Massachusetts	Demolished.		
1870	Chapel, First Church	27 East St	Pittsfield	Massachusetts			
1870	Citizens Hall	13 Willard Hill Rd	Interlaken	Massachusetts			
1872	First M. E. Church	55 Fenn St	Pittsfield	Massachusetts			
1873	Lee Memorial Hall	32 Main St	Lee	Massachusetts			
1874	First Baptist Church	64 North St	Pittsfield	Massachusetts	A remodeling. Demolished in the 1920s.		
1879	Oman Block	52 Main St	Lee	Massachusetts			
1881	Central Block	75 North St	Pittsfield	Massachusetts			
1881	Congregational Church of West Stockbridge	45 Main St	West Stockbridge	Massachusetts			
1883	First Burns Block	297 North St	Pittsfield	Massachusetts			
1884	Englund Block	122 North St	Pittsfield	Massachusetts			
1887	Hoosac Street School	20 Hoosac St	Adams	Massachusetts			
1890	Adams High School	Liberty St	Adams	Massachusetts	Demolished.		
1890	John E. Parsons Estate (Stonover Farm)	169 Under Mountain Rd	Lenox	Massachusetts			
1890	Second Burns Block	297 North St	Pittsfield	Massachusetts			
1891	Buget & Lewis Block	322 Main St	Great Barrington	Massachusetts	Demolished.		
1893	Housatonic Congregational Church	1089 Main St	Housatonic	Massachusetts			
1894	St. Charles R. C. Church	89 Briggs Ave	Pittsfield	Massachusetts			
1895	Rectory, St. Charles R. C. Church	89 Briggs Ave	Pittsfield	Massachusetts			
1896	John H. Casey House	244 Main St	Lee	Massachusetts			
