= Searles High School (Great Barrington, Massachusetts) =

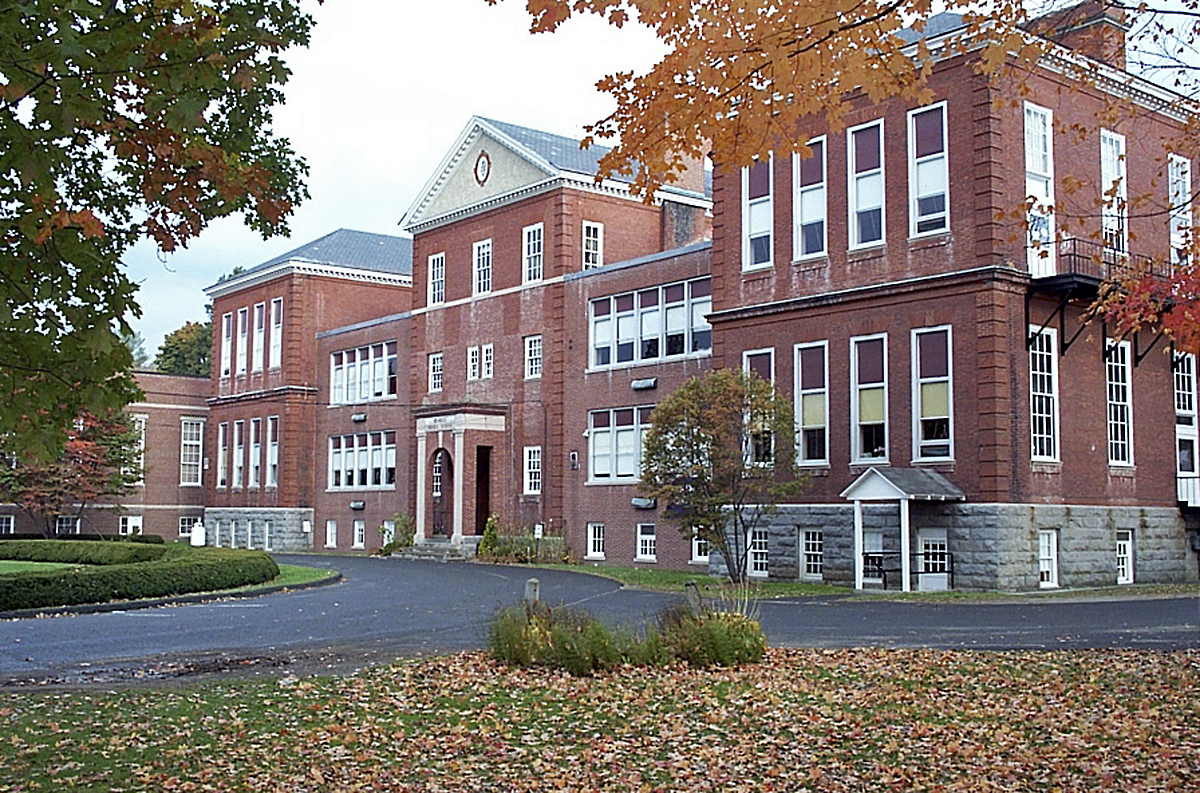
- Front entry to Searles High School

Location
- 79 Bridge Street; Great Barrington, Massachusetts; United States; 42°11′35″N 73°21′35″W

Information
- Type: public secondary school
- Established: 1898
- Status: closed
- Closed: 1968 (SHS) 2005 (SMS)
- School district: Berkshire Hills Regional School District
- Grades: 9-12 (SHS) 5-8 (SMS)
- Gender: coeducational
- Campus: 3 main floors, 2 side annexes, suburban town
- Colors: Buff & Blue
- Athletics: Southern Berkshire League
- Nickname: Mustangs
- Newspaper: The Spectator
- Yearbook: The Climbing Ivy
- The school was originally built in 1898 where it became Searles High School (SHS), but then it was converted into Searles Middle School (SMS) in 1968 where then it was closed permanently in 2005 when Monument Valley Middle School (MVMS) was built, which its name changed in 2020 to DuBois Middle School (DBMS).

Searles High School was a public high school located in Great Barrington in the Berkshire Hills of western Massachusetts. Students attended the school from Great Barrington, the villages of Housatonic, Van Deusenville and other communities in the southern Berkshire region. Searles High School was founded in 1898 and closed in 1968, when its students transferred to a new regional high school. In 1968, it was converted into Searles Middle School, which was closed in 2005. There are plans to make the school into a hotel, which may be stalled indefinitely. In 2004, Monument Valley Middle School was built which replaced Searles Middle School. In 2020, MVMS's name was changed to DuBois Middle School

== Early school history in Great Barrington ==
The history of education in Great Barrington can be traced to a period before the American Revolutionary War in the mid-1700s. Colonial settlers, highly valuing literacy, often supported a local schoolmaster with private donations or church sponsorship. The town's first allocation of public funds to support education occurred in the year of its incorporation, 1761. While an early sign of its commitment to education, it would be a century before the rural pioneer community could support a public high school. Throughout the region one room school houses were opening, focused primarily on basic literacy skills. In the late 1700s and early 1800s more organized efforts emerged through private academies with more advanced teaching capacities. Most notable was a school established by the three Kellogg sisters. The contributions of the Kellogg, Sherwood and Hopkins families to local education are significant. It was the inherited fortune of Mary Sherwood Hopkins Searles, niece of the Kellogg sisters, that funded the widely admired new high school building constructed in 1898.

== High school history ==
Great Barrington's first public high school was established in 1868, occupying a temporary site until a year later when a new building was completed.

== 1898 high school building ==
In 1898 an impressive new building was dedicated for the high school. This event proved so significant for the town that the school was named for its benefactor, and the date marks the founding of Searles High School. The school was named for Edward Francis Searles, whose deceased wife, Mary Hopkins Searles, was a Great Barrington native and had been the wife of Mark Hopkins, Jr., one of California's railroad barons. Early in its history Searles High School served students enrolled from throughout the southwestern corner of the state, as well as from three Connecticut towns and one town in New York.

The new school building was dedicated January 21, 1898. Designed by Boston Architect Henry Vaughan. Known as a church architect, Vaughan collaborated with Searles on a number of projects. The three-story, Queen Anne design was considered to be grand in proportions, exceeding local expectations and receiving acclaim beyond the Berkshire region. The building still stands today and has been the object of various reuse proposals, including that of a boutique hotel to serve the area's significant tourist trade. The new school was built adjacent to “Olympian Field”, a venue for athletic events and an earlier gift to the community from Mr. Searles.

In 1923 there were seven women and four men on the high school faculty to teach 305 students. In June 1935 the high school had its largest graduating class to date of eighty-six students. The increasing enrollment first led to discussions of constructing a new building for the high school, and eventually led to the regionalization discussions beginning in the late 1940s. “The Blotter” was the first school newspaper. In later years the newspaper became known as “The Spectator”. The school's yearbook was “The Climbing Ivy”. Through its seventy-year history, school records document 3,927 graduates.

Upon the opening of the new regional high school and the closing of Searles High School, the 1898 building began to serve as a middle school.

== Student life ==
The 1957 edition of The Climbing Ivy yearbook, gives an account of student life, as the school entered its last decade.

=== Academics ===
The academic curriculum included general, commercial and college preparatory courses. There were twenty-one faculty members, with the principal and vice-principal also serving as instructors. There were sixty-four seniors in 1957, including thirty-eight boys and twenty-six girls. English, history, civics, mathematics and science courses were either required or offered. Latin, French and Spanish were also offered. Additionally, art, mechanical drawing, home economics and physical education were included in the curriculum.

=== Extracurricular activities ===
Searles High School placed a strong emphasis on engaging students with an array of extracurricular activities. There was a student council, and each grade elected four class officers. Each spring several students were chosen to participate at the annual Boys and Girls State in Boston. Student publications included The Climbing Ivy yearbook and Spectator literary magazine, published three times a year.

There was an Orchestra, Band, Majorettes and Dramatics Club. Other clubs included:

- In School Glee Club
- After School Glee Club
- Airplane Club
- First Aid Club
- Camera Club
- Radio Club
- Morse Code Club
- Cooking and Sewing Club
- Izaak Walton Club
- Stamp Club

Complementing the academic curriculum, were Science, Scholastic, Current Events Clubs. In addition to the clubs there were Dance and Float Committees and aTraffic Squad.

=== Athletics ===
The school's small student body was able to support one sport each season for both boys and girls. In the fall, the boys played soccer and the girls played field hockey. Both the boys and girls played basketball in the winter. In the spring the boys fielded a baseball team, while the girls fielded a softball team. There was a cheerleading squad that supported the boys' varsity basketball team.

Searles High School was a member of the Southern Berkshire League, but competed against teams throughout Berkshire County as well as against teams from nearby towns in New York state. In 1957 teams played against these schools:

- Mt. Everett Regional High School, Sheffield, MA
- Williams High School, Stockbridge, MA
- Lee High School, Lee, MA
- Lenox Memorial High School, Lenox, MA
- Dalton High School, Dalton, MA
- Pittsfield High School, Pittsfield, MA
- Drury High School, North Adams, MA
- Roeliff Jansen High School, Hillsdale, NY
- Webutuck High School, Amenia, NY

== Principals of the high school, 1898-1967 ==
- George R. Pinkham 1898–1903
- Wallace E. Richmond 1903–1910
- Charles A. Holbrook 1910–1911
- J. Leslie Purdom 1911–1916
- Arthur W. Ruff 1916–1918
- W. Scott Austin 1918–1924
- Roland M. Bartlett 1924–1929
- E.J. Franklin 1929–1930
- Kenneth J. Preston 1930–1939
- Saron M. Husted 1939–1943
- Frank T. Coughlin 1943–1955
- John A. Clark 1955–1967

== Regionalization ==
Creating economies of scale was the rationale for the school regionalization efforts of the 1950s and 1960s. However, discussions around regionalization were complex and often contentious. Faced with increasing costs for maintaining adequate facilities, instructional personnel and curricular resources, some small rural districts felt pressured to explore consolidation with neighboring districts. For over a decade into the mid-1960s, Great Barrington explored consolidation with partners to the west and south, including Alford, Egremont, Mt. Washington, Sheffield and New Marlborough. Ultimately, those towns formed the Southern Berkshire Regional School District, the first of many regional districts in the state. Great Barrington chose not to regionalize with these partners.

=== Regionalization approved ===
Great Barrington began negotiating with new partners to the north. In June 1965 its voters joined those in Stockbridge and West Stockbridge in approving plans for a regional high school. The favorable vote tallies were: 922–554 in Great Barrington, 407–149 in Stockbridge and 178–55 in West Stockbridge. They created the Berkshire Hills Regional School District, and planning began for their primary and secondary schools to be located on adjoining campuses in Great Barrington. The district offices would be located in Stockbridge. The regionalization agreement united long-time sports rivals Searles High School and Williams High School into one student body.

== School closure ==
The last class to graduate from Searles High School was in June 1967. The school did not actually close until April 1968, when the senior and junior classes moved to the newly completed Monument Mountain Regional High School in Great Barrington near the Stockbridge town line. Economies of scale for rural districts and increasing student populations led to the closure of its high school, an outcome Great Barrington had debated for over a decade. While the new regional high school was located within the town's city limits, it was several miles to the north of the 1898 building's central location in the heart of Great Barrington's small downtown.

=== Remodeling controversy ===
The conversion of the historic 1898 Queen Anne school building into a boutique hotel provoked intense controversy in the town. In spite of the project's approval by the town's Historic Commission, strong community sentiment favors preservation of one of the town's landmark structures. The hotel proposal involves maintaining some internal structural elements, but models depict a fully transformed contemporary facade with no trace of the admired original Queen Anne design. A “Save the Searles School” effort has been undertaken to stop the project. After delays caused by the COVID-19 pandemic in Massachusetts and a fire in the vacant building in 2022, the project moved forward in March 2024 with the demolition of the former school gymnasium and other annex buildings on the property.
