= Saint Andrew's Chapel =

Saint Andrew's Chapel or St Andrew's Chapel may refer to:

== Denmark ==
- St Andrew's Chapel and St Bridget's Chapel, Roskilde

== Malta ==
- St Andrew's Chapel, Żurrieq

== Slovakia ==
- St. Andrew's Chapel, Koš

== United Kingdom ==
- St Andrew's Chapel, Ribston Hall, Great Ribson, England
- Saint Andrew's Chapel, Romford, England

== United States ==
- Saint Andrew's Chapel (Sanford, Florida)
- Saint Andrew's Chapel (Washington, Massachusetts), listed on the National Register of Historic Places

== See also ==
- St. Andrew's Church
