= Congregational Church of West Stockbridge =

Historic church in Massachusetts, United States

- U.S. National Register of Historic Places
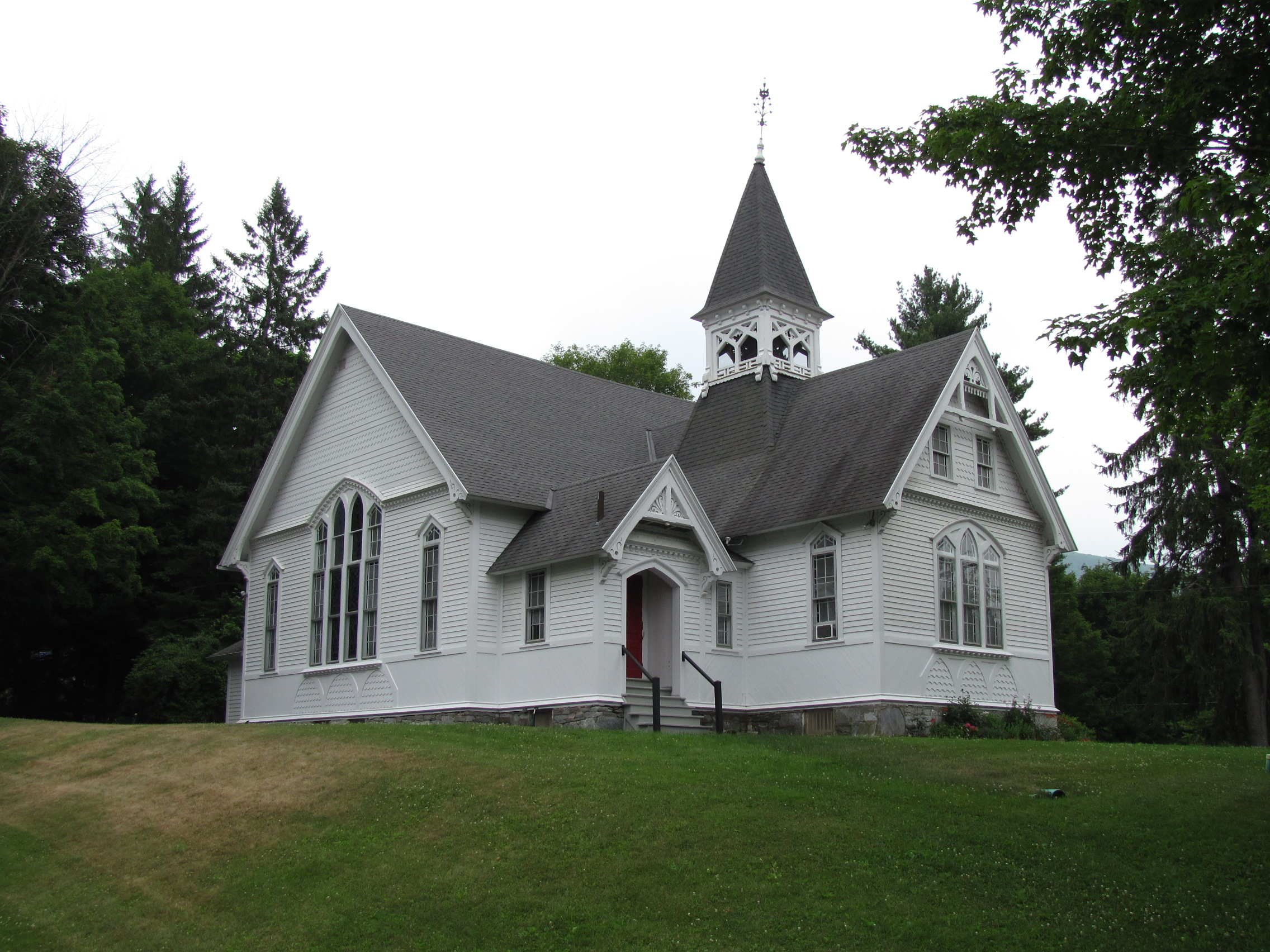
- Congregational Church of West Stockbridge

- Location within Massachusetts Location within the United States
- Location: 45 Main St., West Stockbridge, Massachusetts
- Coordinates: 42°19′57″N 73°22′1″W
- Area: less than one acre
- Built: 1882
- Built by: B. H. Hatch
- Architect: Charles T. Rathbun
- Architectural style: Stick/Eastlake
- NRHP reference No.: 96000899
- Added to NRHP: July 30, 1996

The Congregational Church of West Stockbridge is an historic Congregational church building at 45 Main Street in West Stockbridge, Massachusetts. Completed in 1882 for a congregation founded in 1774, it is the town's best example of Stick style architecture. It was listed on the National Register of Historic Places in 1996, and continues in use by the original congregation.

== Architecture and history ==
The Congregational Church of West Stockbridge is located in the village of West Center, on the east side of Main Street (Massachusetts Route 102) at its junction with Old Barrington Road. It is a single-story wood-frame structure, with a gable-roofed cruciform plan. A single-stage belfry rises above one of the wings, capped by a pyramidal roof. The gable ends and tower have applied woodwork characteristic of the Stick style, and there are fields of decorative shingles beneath the stained glass windows that adorn the larger gable ends.

The town's early Congregationalists were its first settlers, and both the town and congregation were organized in 1774. The Congregationalists met in private homes until 1789, when the town's meeting house was complete enough for use. This building was used by the town for civic purposes, and was shared with a local Baptist congregation until 1793. By the 1830s, the present town center had outstripped the village of West Center in importance, but a new congregation was organized in 1833 to serve the latter area. Its first building, constructed in 1843, was destroyed by fire in 1881. This church its second, was dedicated in February 1882, and was built by local contractor B. H. Hatch of Great Barrington. It was built in the then-fashionable Stick style, to a design by Pittsfield architect Charles T. Rathbun.

== See also ==
- National Register of Historic Places listings in Berkshire County, Massachusetts
