= Hoosac Street School =

- U.S. National Register of Historic Places
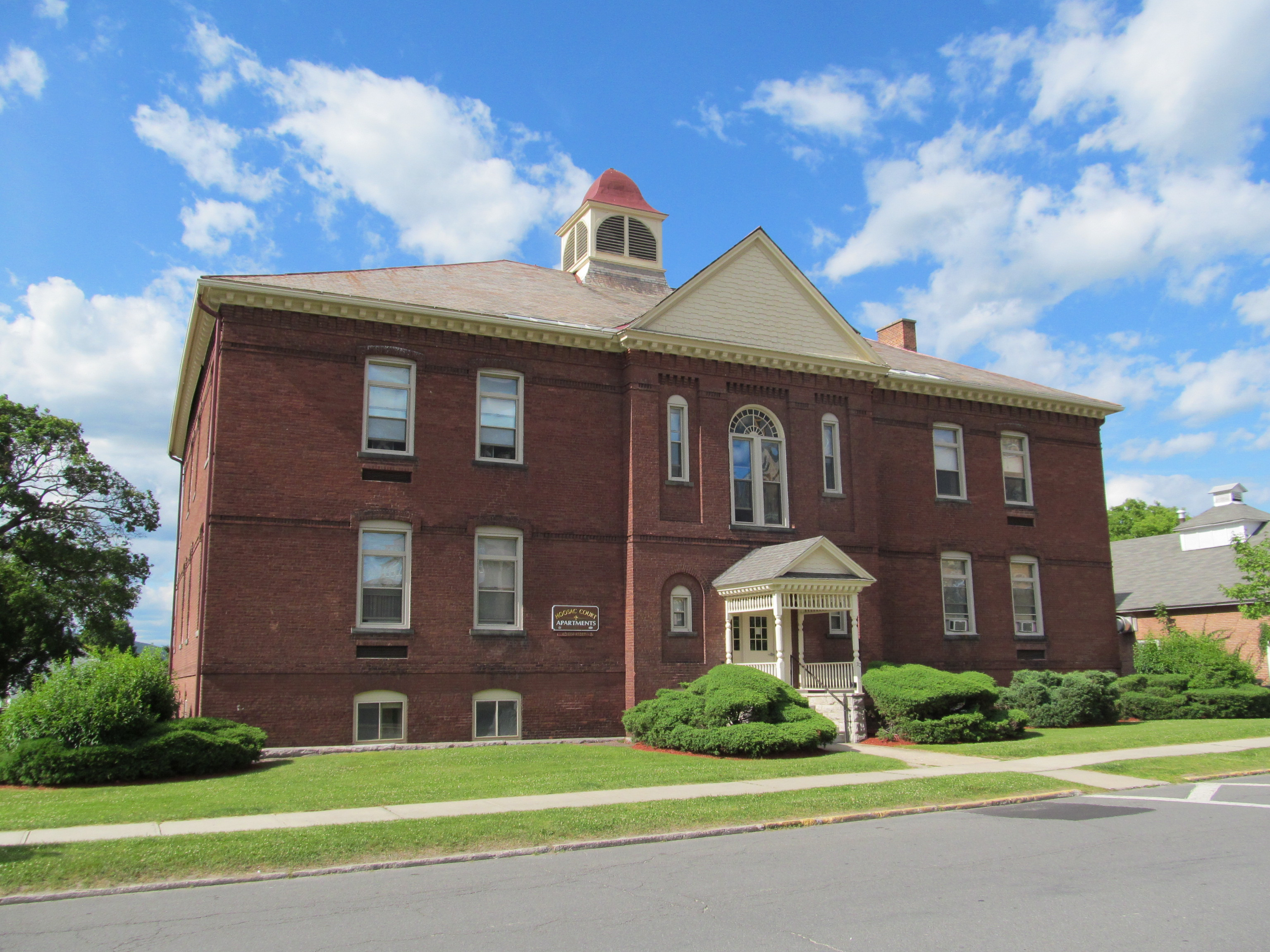
- Hoosac Street School

- Location within Massachusetts Location within the United States
- Location: 20 Hoosac St., Adams, Massachusetts
- Coordinates: 42°37′31″N 73°06′50″W
- Built: 1887
- Built by: Walters & Fuller
- Architect: Charles T. Rathbun
- Architectural style: Colonial Revival, Queen Anne
- NRHP reference No.: 87002547
- Added to NRHP: February 10, 1988

The Hoosac Street School is a historic school building at 20 Hoosac Street in Adams, Massachusetts. Built in 1887, it is a good local example of transitional Queen Anne/Colonial Revival architecture, and a significant reminder of the town's rapid growth in the late 19th century. It was listed on the National Historic Register in 1988.

== Description and history ==
The former Hoosac Street School stands in a mixed residential and commercial area east of Adams' downtown area, at the northeast corner of Hoosac and North Hoosac Streets. It is a two-story brick structure with a hip roof topped by a cupola. The main facade is divided into three sections, the center one, which contains the entrance, projecting slightly. The flanking sections have pairs of sash windows on each level; the center section has the entrance, flanked by small windows and sheltered by a small gabled portico, on the first level, and a double window topped by an elliptical window flanked by narrow windows of equal height on the second.

The school was built in 1887, when Adams was experiencing burgeoning growth due to the growth of its industrial capacity. In addition to general population growth occasioned by the improved economy, the need for additional schools was prompted by state requirements mandating education for children to the age of sixteen. Along with several other schools of the period that have survived, it was built in a Queen Anne/Stick style. It was designed by Charles Rathbun of Pittsfield, and completed at a cost of $20,000. The land it occupies was previously farmland. It remained in use as a primary school until 1981, when all of the town's elementary schools were consolidated into a single facility. In 1985 the building was converted into 12 two bedroom apartments.

== See also ==
- National Register of Historic Places listings in Berkshire County, Massachusetts
