= Theodore Parker Unitarian Universalist Church =

Historic church in Massachusetts, United States

- U.S. National Register of Historic Places
- Boston Landmark
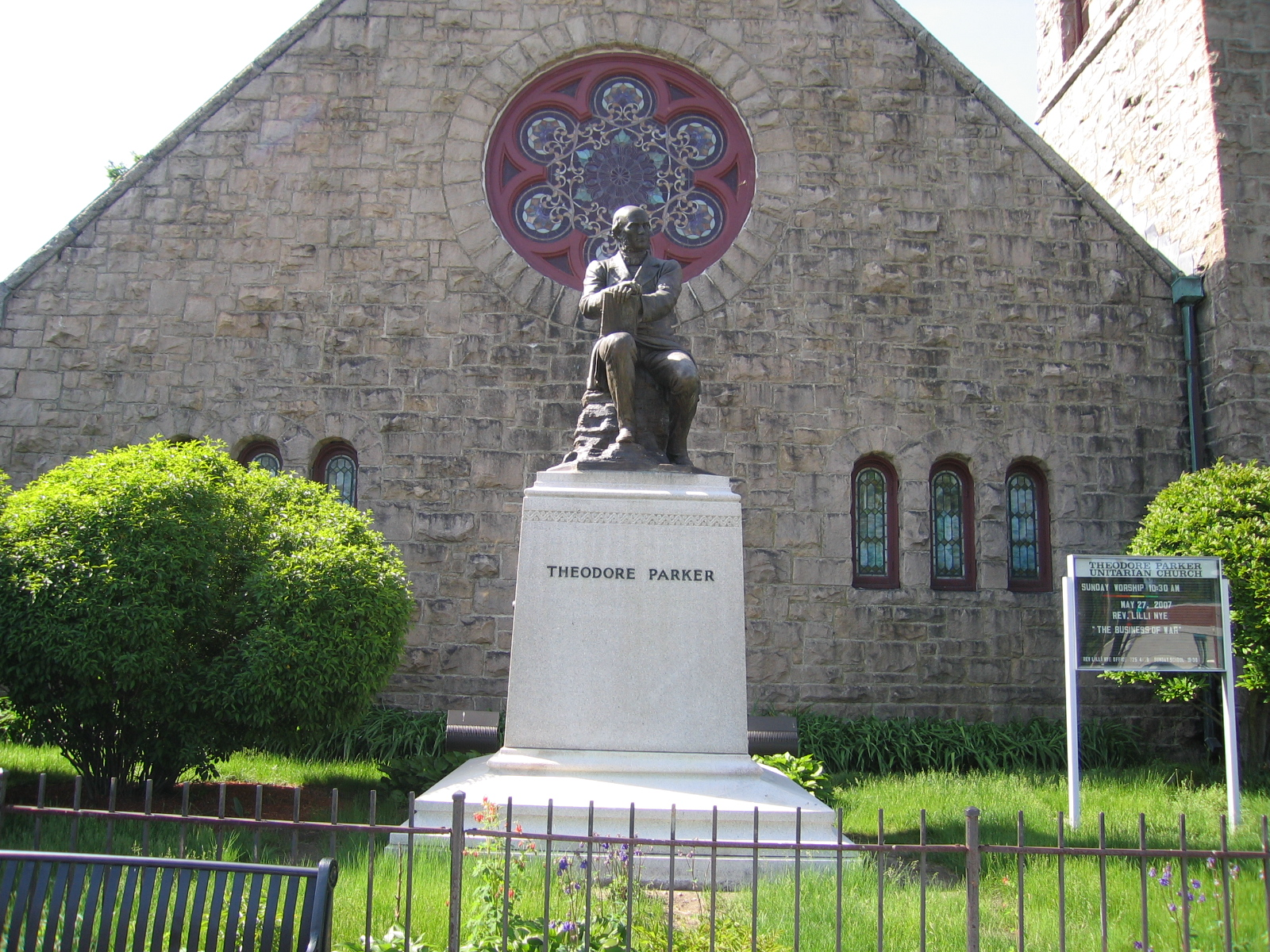

- Location within Massachusetts Location within the United States
- Location: 1859 Centre St., West Roxbury, Boston, Massachusetts
- Coordinates: 42°17′10″N 71°9′18″W
- Area: less than one acre
- Built: 1900
- Architect: Seaver, Henry M.
- Architectural style: Normanesque
- NRHP reference No.: 100005274

Significant dates
- Added to NRHP: June 29, 2020
- Designated BOSL: April 9, 1985

Theodore Parker Unitarian Universalist Church is a historic church building at 1859 Centre Street in the West Roxbury neighborhood of Boston, Massachusetts. Built in 1900 to a design by West Roxbury native Henry M. Seaver, it is a locally significant example of Normanesque architecture, and is adorned by stained glass windows created by Louis Comfort Tiffany and his firm. The church was listed on the National Register of Historic Places in 2020. The congregation it houses was founded in 1712, and is named for the influential Transcendentalist and abolitionist Theodore Parker, who was the congregation's minister in the 1840s.

== Architecture and history ==
The Theodore Parker Church stands in the village center of West Roxbury, on the west side of Centre Street at Corey Street. It is a large stone structure, built out of pink granite. It is covered by a large gabled roof (originally slate, now asphalt), with a heavy square tower at the front right corner. The tower houses entrance facing both streets on the ground floor, narrow slit windows on a middle level, and a belfry with round-arch louvered openings. It is topped by a crenellated parapet. The front-facing gable has a large rose window at its center, while a side gable facing Corey Street has a triptych of three tall and slender stained glass windows. Connected to the main church building via a breezeway is an older church building, designed by Alexander Wadsworth Longfellow Jr. in 1890 and now serving as a parish hall.

The West Roxbury congregation was founded in 1712, when the colonial legislature authorized a parish in the western part of Roxbury (then a separate community from Boston). Originally conservative Protestant in outlook, the congregation became more liberal in 1830s. Theodore Parker, a leading figure the development of Transcendentalism in Massachusetts, was the church's minister 1837–1846. Its church was damaged by fire in 1890, at which time the Longfellow building was constructed as a replacement. Just ten years later, the growing congregation built the main sanctuary, retaining local architect Henry Seaver for its design. It is the only known work of Seaver in his home town. Its stained glass windows were designed by Tiffany studios (some probably by Louis Comfort Tiffany personally), and were installed between 1894 and 1927.

== See also ==
- National Register of Historic Places listings in southern Boston, Massachusetts
