= Citizens Hall =

- U.S. National Register of Historic Places
- U.S. Historic district – Contributing property
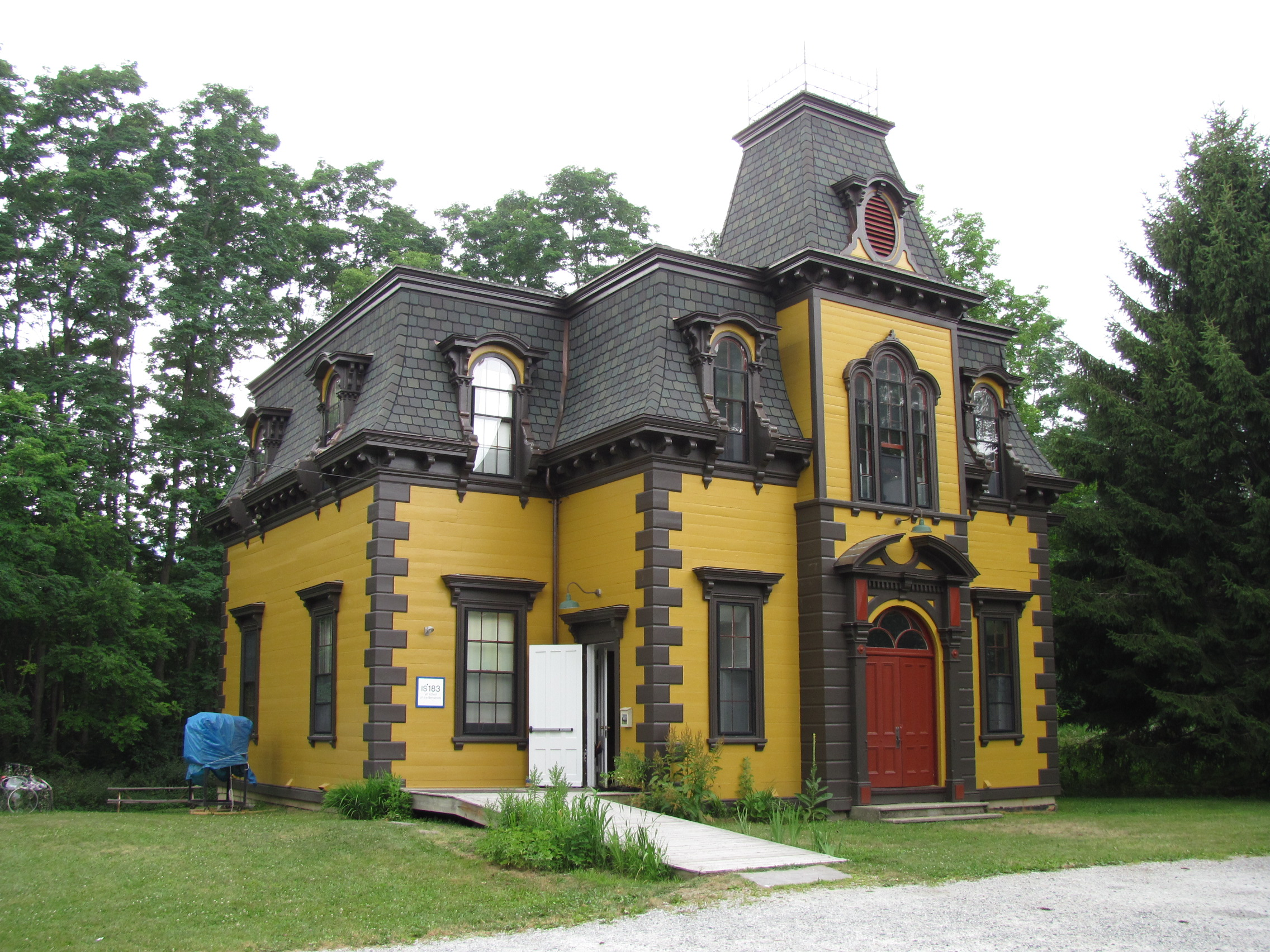
- Citizens Hall

- Location within Massachusetts Location within the United States
- Location: 13 Willard Hill Rd., Interlaken, Massachusetts
- Coordinates: 42°18′58″N 73°19′52″W
- Area: 2 acres (0.81 ha)
- Built: 1870
- Architect: Charles T. Rathbun
- Architectural style: Second Empire, Italianate
- Part of: Old Curtisville Historic District (ID76000250)
- NRHP reference No.: 72000126

Significant dates
- Added to NRHP: June 19, 1972
- Designated CP: October 29, 1976

Citizens Hall is a historic municipal building at 13 Willard Hill Road in Interlaken, a village of Stockbridge, Massachusetts. Built in 1870 as a schoolhouse and community meeting center, it is a well-preserved local example of Second Empire architecture. The hall was listed on the National Register of Historic Places in 1972, and included as a contributing property in the Old Curtisville Historic District in 1976. It now houses Berkshire Art Center (IS183, INC).

== Description and history ==
Citizens Hall is located in the village of Interlaken, on the west side of Willard Hill Road south of its junctions with Interlaken Cross Road and Interlaken Road. It is a two-story wood frame building, with a mansard roof and flushboarded exterior with corner quoining. The roof cornice is adorned with delicately carved wooden brackets. The central portion of the main facade projects, with a three-story tower projecting slightly further forward. The main entrance is located in the base of the tower, which is also topped by a mansard-style roof with an iron railing at the top. Above the entrance is a three-part Palladian style window, each section having a rounded top. Ground floor windows are framed by bracketed cornices and sills.

In 1866 the town of Stockbridge abolished its district school system, opting instead for a scheme in which graded schools were located in each of the town's villages. This The hall was built in 1870 as a school and community center serving what was then a mill village then known as Curtisville, and is now called Interlaken. It was designed by Pittsfield architect Charles T. Rathbun. In 1991 it was adapted for use by the Interlaken School of Art, later named Berkshire Art Center in June 2022.

== See also ==
- National Register of Historic Places listings in Berkshire County, Massachusetts
