= Glendale Power House =

Historic power station in Massachusetts, US

- U.S. National Register of Historic Places
- U.S. Historic district
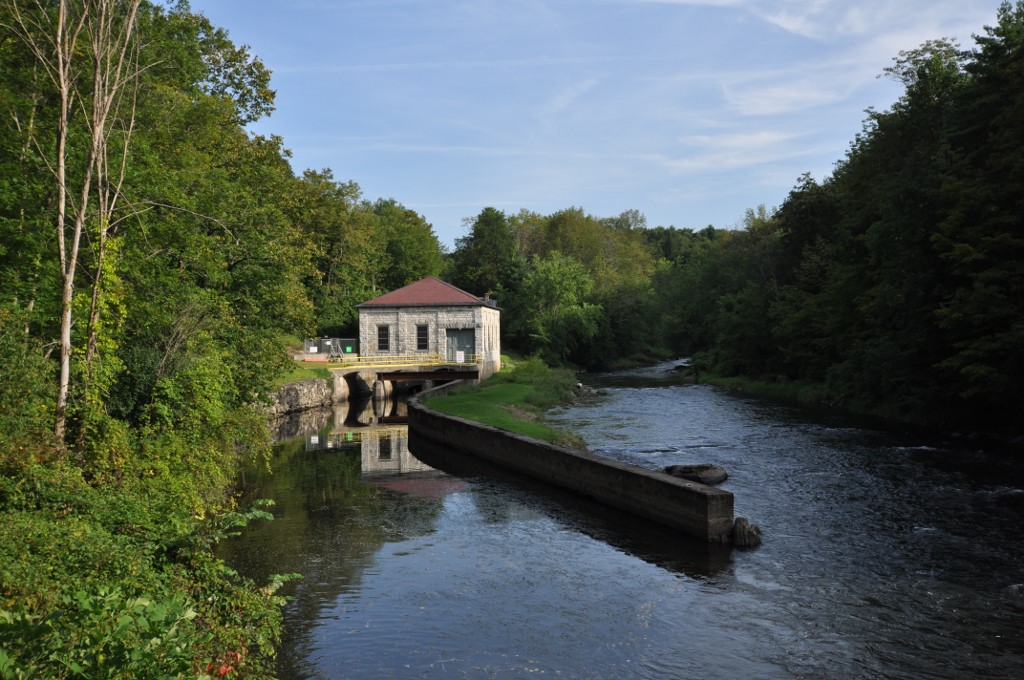

- Location within Massachusetts Location within the United States
- Location: Housatonic River off MA 183, Stockbridge, Massachusetts
- Coordinates: 42°16′50″N 73°21′11″W
- Area: 13.3 acres (5.4 ha)
- Built: 1905
- Architect: F.O. Toquet
- NRHP reference No.: 82004957
- Added to NRHP: June 24, 1982

The Glendale Power House is a historic power station on the Housatonic River, just off Massachusetts Route 183 in Stockbridge, Massachusetts. The 1905 power house, built for the Monument Mills, was one of the first places in the United States where electricity was generated for the purpose of providing power to an industrial facility. The station was listed on the National Register of Historic Places in 1982. The facility has been rehabilitated and converted into modernized hydroelectric power generation plant.

== Description and history ==
The Glendale Power House is located southwest of Stockbridge's village center, sandwiched between Massachusetts Route 183 on the northwest bank of the Housatonic River, below the point where Glendale Middle Road crosses the river. The property is over 13 acres (5.3 ha) in size, with a dam at the northern end (just south of the bridge), a power canal 1,500 feet (460 m) in length, and a stone power house. The dam is 28 feet (8.5 m) in height, and is built out of poured concrete. The canal is 40 feet (12 m) wide, and was dug out of heavy clay. The power house is a single-story stone structure, three bays wide and four long, with a slate roof. The interior is a single large chamber, which historically house turbines and electrical control equipment. A sliding gantry-style crane provided the means to move equipment around within the building for maintenance.

The power plant was built in 1905 by Monument Mills of Housatonic, at the site of a dam that dated to the 1840s for a papermaking operation. The stone building uses stone originally quarried for the Glendale Woolen Mill. By 1909, this plant was providing half of the mills' power requirements. The power station was taken out of service in 1946, and most of its original generation equipment removed. The property was redeveloped to provide hydroelectric power to the main grid in the 1980s. Its four turbines can produce 1.07 MW of electricity. Electricity generation depends on the availability of water; during a drought, the water level might fall too low to run the turbines.

== See also ==
- National Register of Historic Places listings in Berkshire County, Massachusetts
