= Old Curtisville Historic District =

Historic district in Massachusetts, United States

- U.S. National Register of Historic Places
- U.S. Historic district
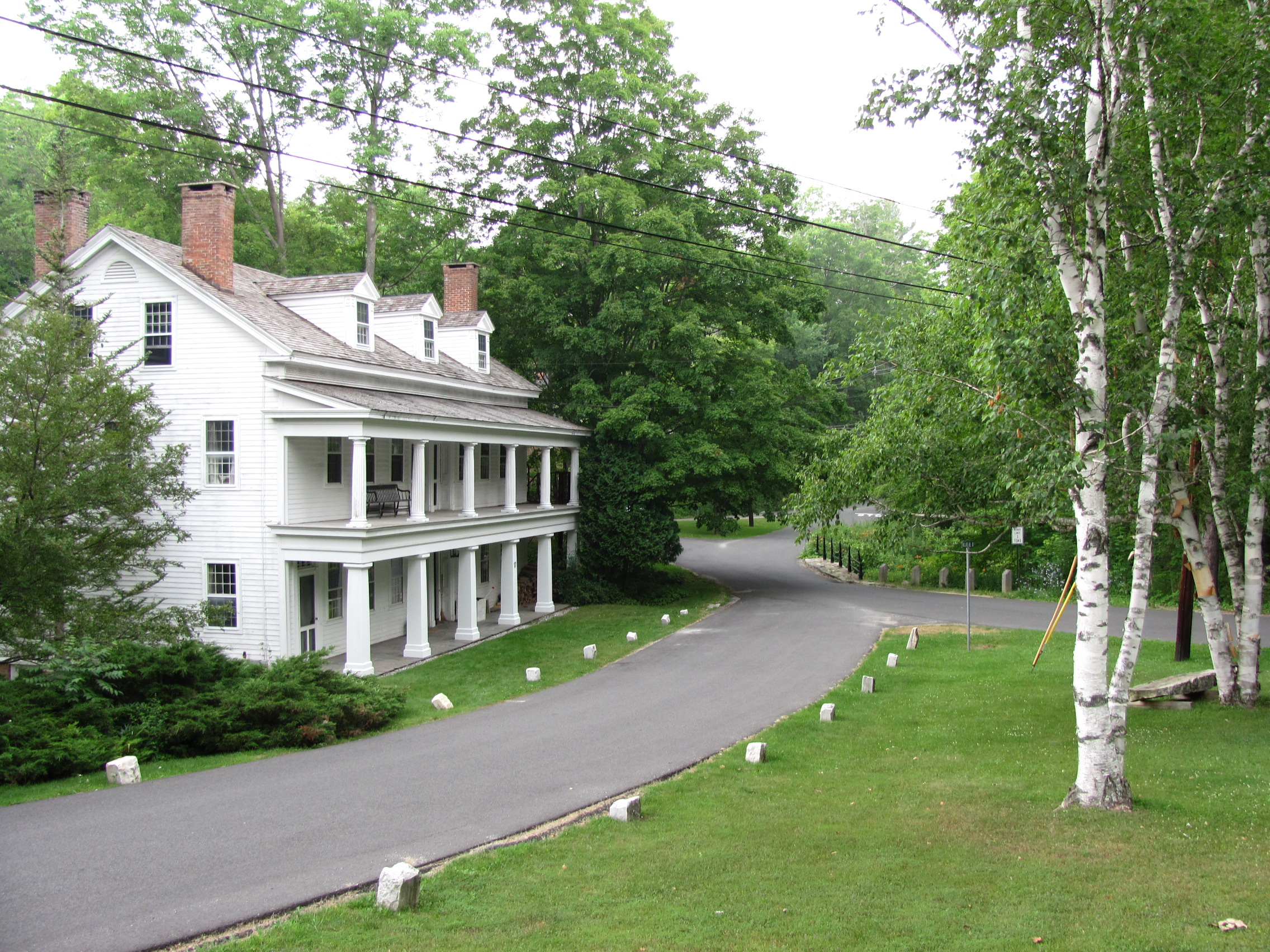
- Former Bancroft-Curtisville Hotel

- Location within Massachusetts Location within the United States
- Location: Stockbridge, Massachusetts
- Coordinates: 42°18′57″N 73°19′57″W
- Area: 170 acres (69 ha)
- Built: 1834
- Architectural style: Greek Revival, Second Empire, Federal
- NRHP reference No.: 76000250
- Added to NRHP: October 29, 1976

Old Curtisville Historic District encompasses the village center of Interlaken in Stockbridge, Massachusetts. It is historically significant as the site of the first wood-based newsprint paper mill in the United States, and has a well-preserved collection of late 18th and early 19th-century architecture. It was listed on the National Register of Historic Places in 1976.

== Description and history ==
The area now known as Interlaken, is located in northern Stockbridge, between Stockbridge Bowl (originally Lake Mahkeenac) and Lake Averic (also known as Echo Lake), which is the town of Stockbridge's water supply. Massachusetts Route 183 transects the community north to south. The road roughly parallels Larrywaug Brook, the outflow of Stockbridge Bowl. In the 18th century, this section of brook was developed industrially, and by the 1820s had at least seven mills, a foundry, distillery, and a thriving village center. The village was bypassed by the railroad, which ultimately led to the failure of many of these enterprises. It saw a brief resurgence in its economy after the American Civil War, when the Pagenstacher Paper Mill, the nation's first wood-pulp paper mill, operated here. Like the earlier business, it eventually left the village due to the poor transit situation. Around the turn of the 20th century the village began to be seen as part of the Berkshire's summer resort area. Its post office was renamed from Curtisville to Interlaken in 1902.

The historic district is roughly triangular in shape, its main axes on Interlaken Road (Route 183), Train Hill Road, and Averic Road. It is about 170 acres (69 ha) in size, with 53 historically significant buildings, and the ruins of upward of twenty water-based mills. Among ts noteworthy historic buildings are the Interlaken Congregational Church (1824), the Citizens Hall (1870), and the Bancroft-Curtisville Hotel, once the location of the St. Helen's Home. The church and hotel are now private residences and the hall is the site of the IS 183 Art School of the Berkshires. St. Helen's Home was sponsored by the New York Tribune's Fresh Air Fund in the opening decades of the twentieth century. The Fund enabled children from some of New York City's poorest neighborhoods to experience several weeks of summer respite in rural locations in upstate New York and New England.

== Gallery ==
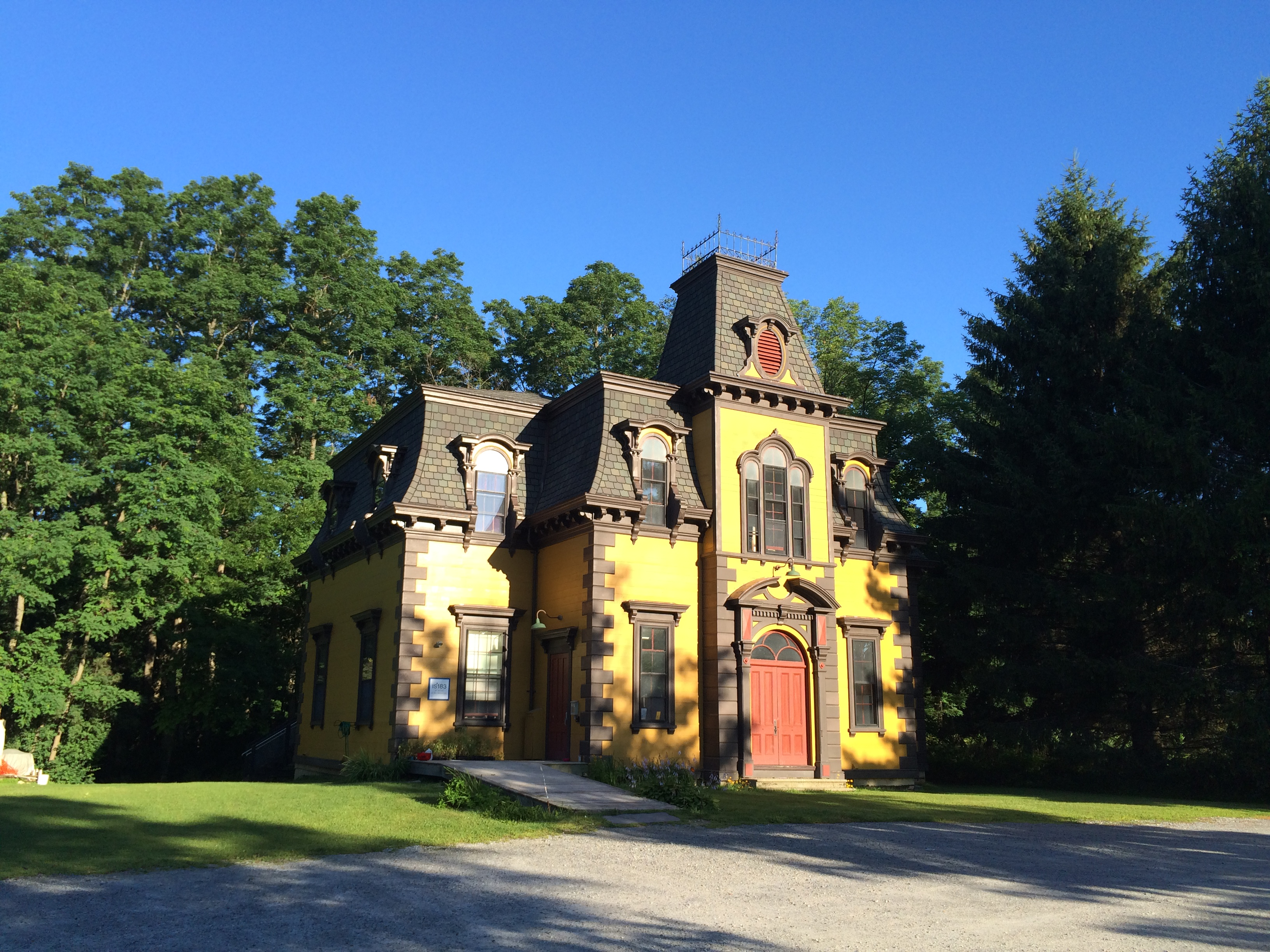
Citizens Hall (1870), former school house and community center

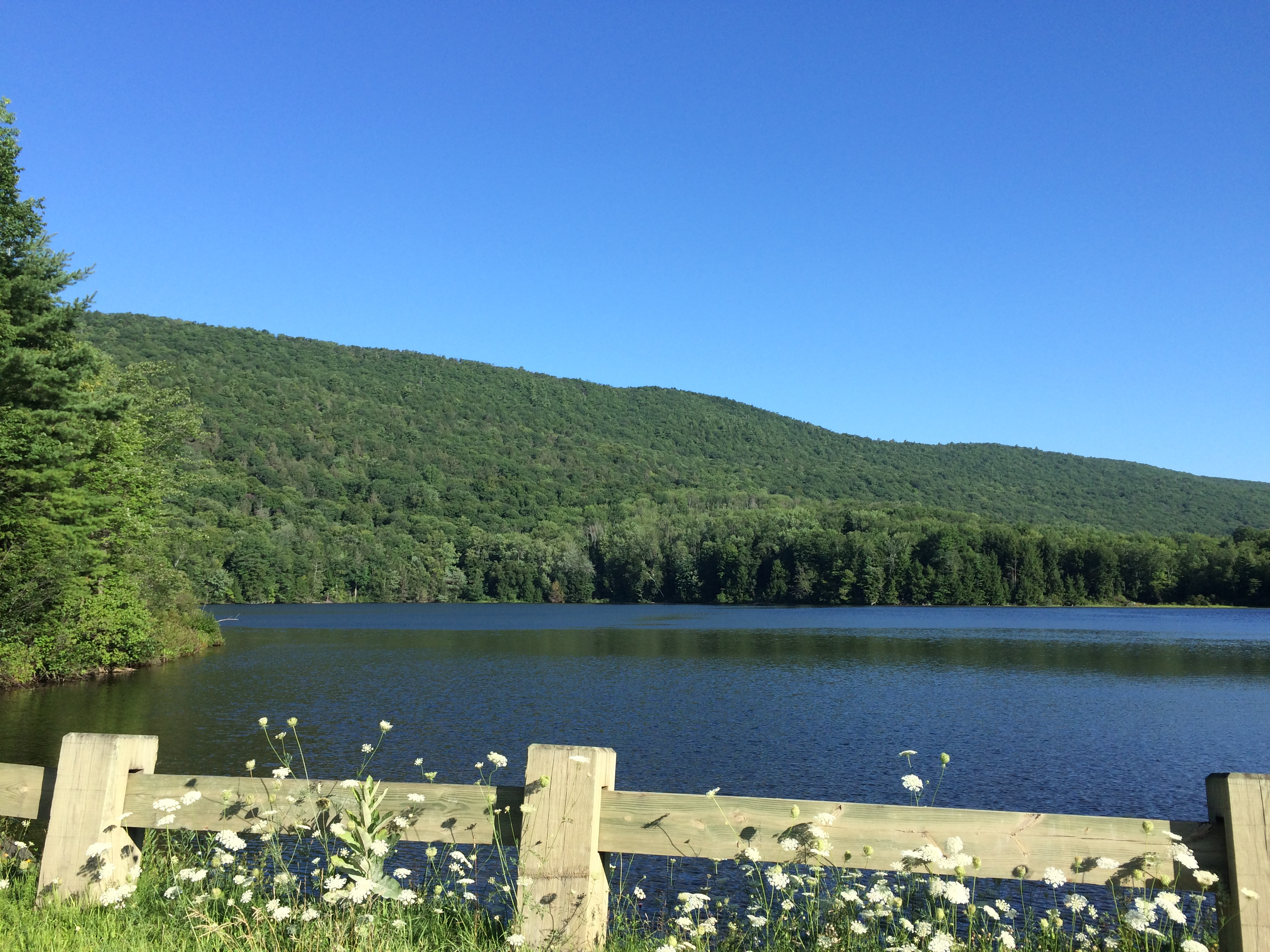
Lake Averic (Echo Lake) & West Stockbridge Mountain

== See also ==
- National Register of Historic Places listings in Berkshire County, Massachusetts
