= Monument Mills =

- U.S. National Register of Historic Places
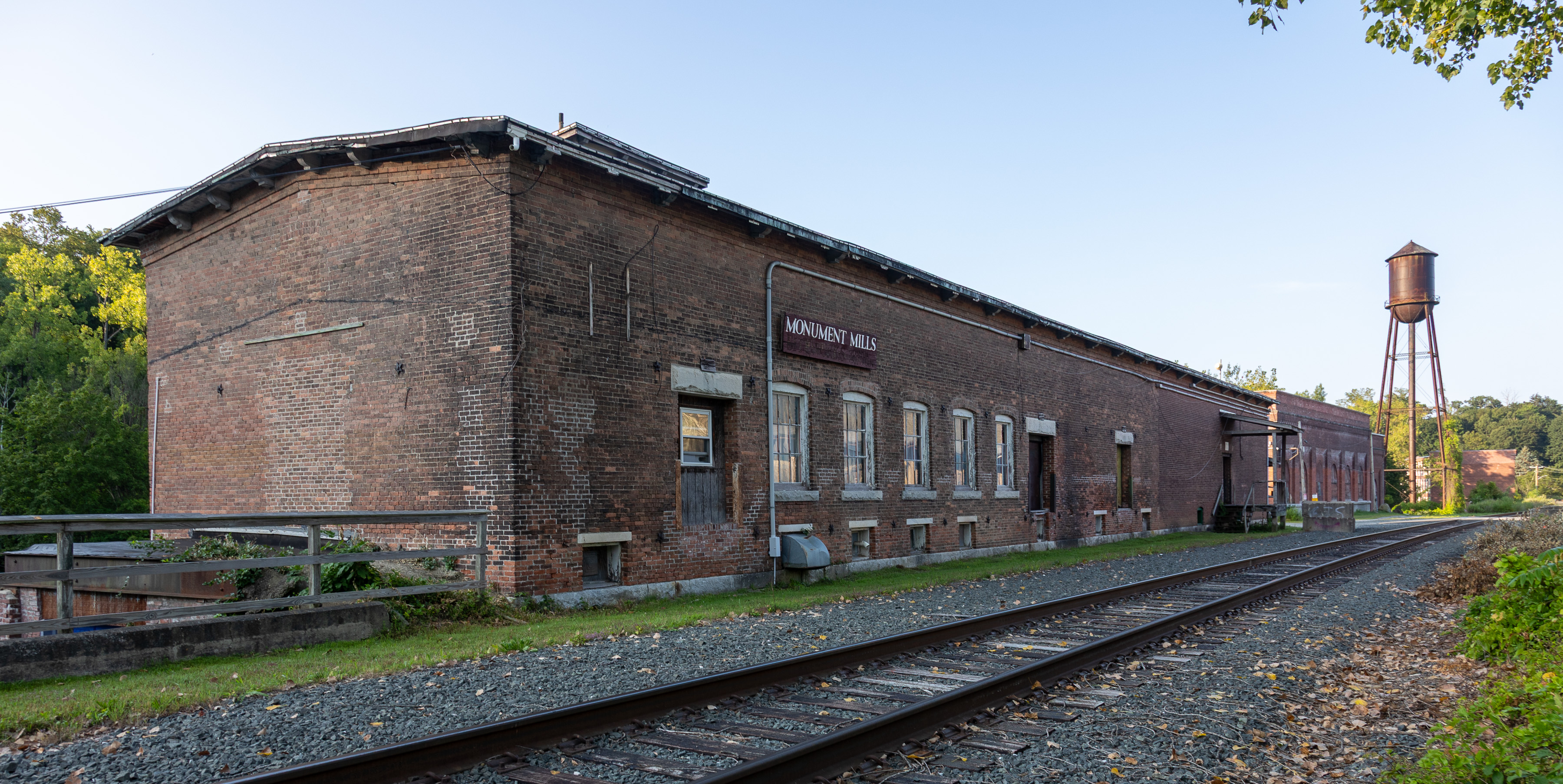
- Power House

- Location within Massachusetts Location within the United States
- Location: Park and Front Sts., Great Barrington, Massachusetts
- Coordinates: 42°15′19″N 73°21′52″W
- Area: 13.25 acres (5.36 ha)
- Built: 1851, 1892
- Architect: C. R. Makepeace & Company
- NRHP reference No.: 83003927
- Added to NRHP: November 29, 1983

Monument Mills are historic textile mills at Park and Front Streets in the Housatonic village of Great Barrington, Massachusetts. Developed beginning in the mid-19th century, they were a major American producer of jacquard fabrics, operating until 1955. The mill complexes were listed on the National Register of Historic Places in 1983. Today, some parts of the complex houses artists and small businesses.

== Description and history ==
The Monument Mills are a prominent central feature of Housatonic village, lining both sides of the Housatonic River, from which they initially drew their power. The number one mill is located near the northern end of the village, between the railroad tracks and the river's west bank. The number two mill is located on the east bank of the river, just north of Park Street bridge.

The Monument Mills Company operated a textile business at these sites between 1850 and 1955. The first mill, operating at the northern end of the complex, was fitted for cotton fabric production, and was joined by the second mill, under separate ownership, in 1866. The second mill specialized in the production of jacquard fabrics for bedspreads; its success prompted the first company to buy the second, and expand production. A decline in demand and changing tastes in textiles brought about reduced business, and the mills closed in 1955, which thereafter suffered from vacancy and neglect.

The mill complex, which is sometimes rented out for film and photo shoots, consists of:

- A 4,000 square foot (370 m^{2}) turbine room, with a ceiling height of 50 feet (15 m), and a gantry
- A 2,000 square foot (190 m^{2}) hydropower and transformer rooms, featuring a ceiling height of 25 feet (7.6 m)
- A 10,000 square foot (930 m^{2}) boiler house, open to the skies, with 30 feet (9.1 m) feet tall windows
- A tall water tower

A freight train line passes through the complex.

The company was also responsible for the construction of the Glendale Power House further up the Housatonic River in Stockbridge; this facility was one of the first hydroelectric power stations built to provide power for industrial work, and is also listed on the National Register.

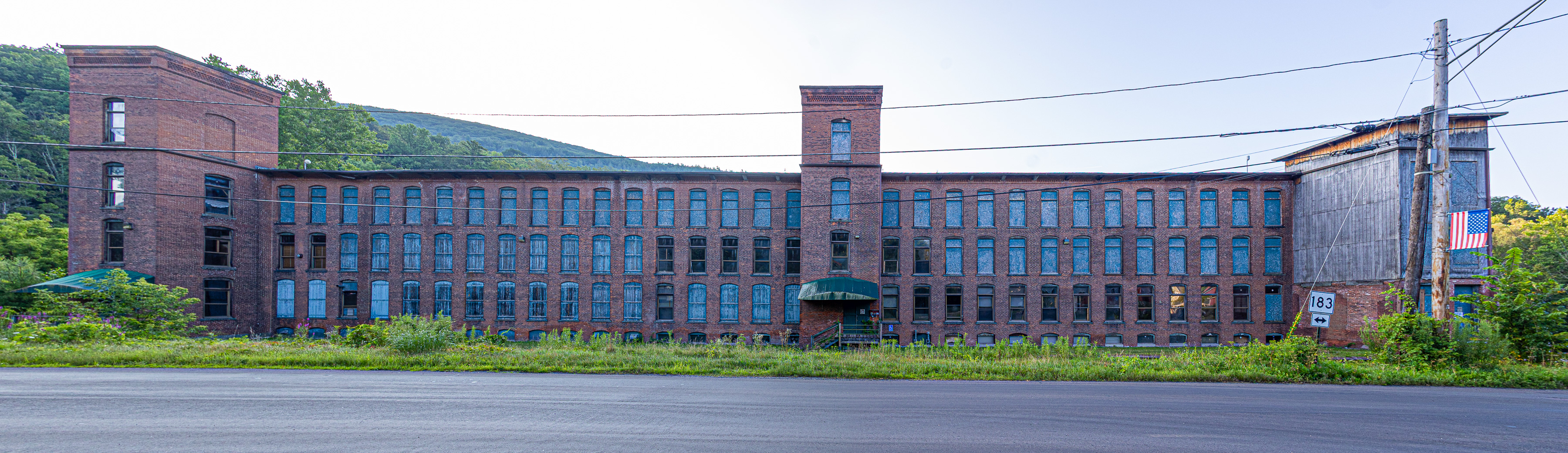
Cotton Mill No. 1

== See also ==
- National Register of Historic Places listings in Berkshire County, Massachusetts
