= NORAD (disambiguation) =

NORAD is the North American Aerospace Defense Command, a United States/Canada military alliance.

NORAD or Norad may also refer to:

- Norwegian Agency for Development Cooperation
- NORAD (board game), a 1970s war simulation game
- Noradrenaline or norad, a hormone and a neurotransmitter
- EHC Hoensbroek or EHC Hoensbroek Norad, a Dutch football club
- Norad Mill, North Adams, Massachusetts, on the US National Register of Historic Places
- NORAD satellite identifier or NORAD ID, also known as Satellite Catalog Number
