= Sykes House =

Historic house in Massachusetts, United States

- U.S. National Register of Historic Places
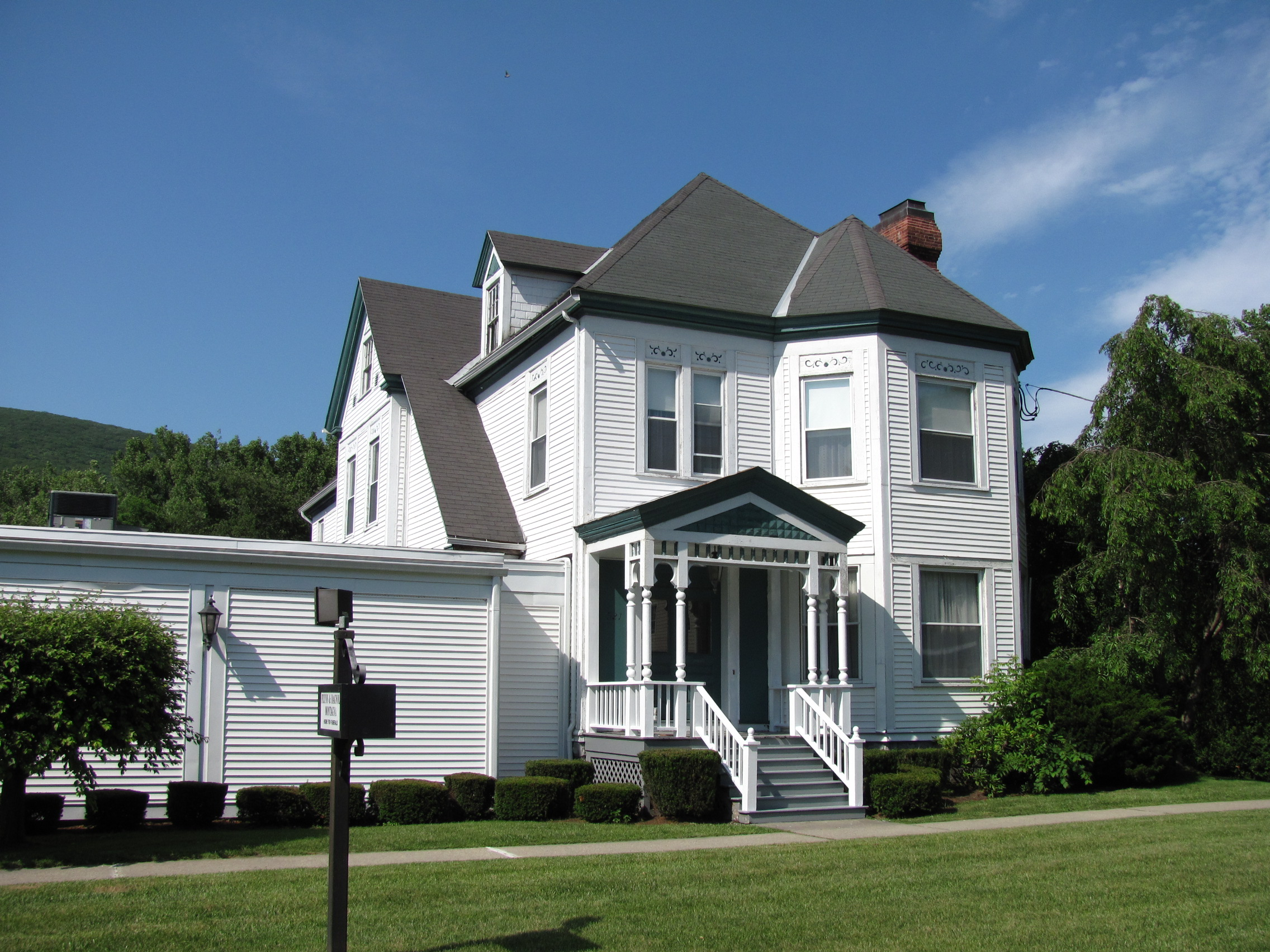
- (2010)

- Location within Massachusetts Location within the United States
- Location: 521 W. Main St., North Adams, Massachusetts
- Coordinates: 42°41′56″N 73°7′59″W
- Built: 1890
- Architect: Porter & Hannum
- Architectural style: Queen Anne
- MPS: North Adams MRA
- NRHP reference No.: 85003420
- Added to NRHP: October 25, 1985

The Sykes House is a historic house located at 521 West Main Street in North Adams, Massachusetts. It was built in 1890, and is a prominent local example of Queen Anne architecture. It was listed on the National Register of Historic Places in 1985.

== Description and history ==
The Sykes House is located in Braytonville, one mile west of downtown North Adams, on the north side of West Main Street (Massachusetts Route 2) opposite Marion Avenue. It is a 2 1/2-story wood-frame structure, with a complex roof line and mostly clapboarded exterior. A polygonal bay projects to the front and right side, with the main entrance to its left. The entrance is sheltered by a porch with turned posts, a spindled valance, and a decorative panel in the gable. The chimney has a decorative brick corbelling at the top. Windows on the second floor have decorative carving in the lintels above them. A single-story ell extends to the left, and a two-story ell extends to the rear.

The house was built by the Porter & Hannum company, a leading homebuilder in North Adams, for Thomas Sykes, a supervisor at the North Adams Manufacturing Company. Sykes, a native of Vermont, spent 25 years with the company, in addition to working at other mills in the region. The house is not as elaborate or lavish as many Queen Anne designs, and its design may have originated in a mail-order catalog. The only major modification to the building was the addition in 1920 of a two-story porch structure on the rear right side. The house has seen a variety of uses, including as a rooming house a combination art studio and residence.

== See also ==
- National Register of Historic Places listings in Berkshire County, Massachusetts
