= Monument Square–Eagle Street Historic District =

Historic district in Massachusetts, United States

- U.S. National Register of Historic Places
- U.S. Historic district
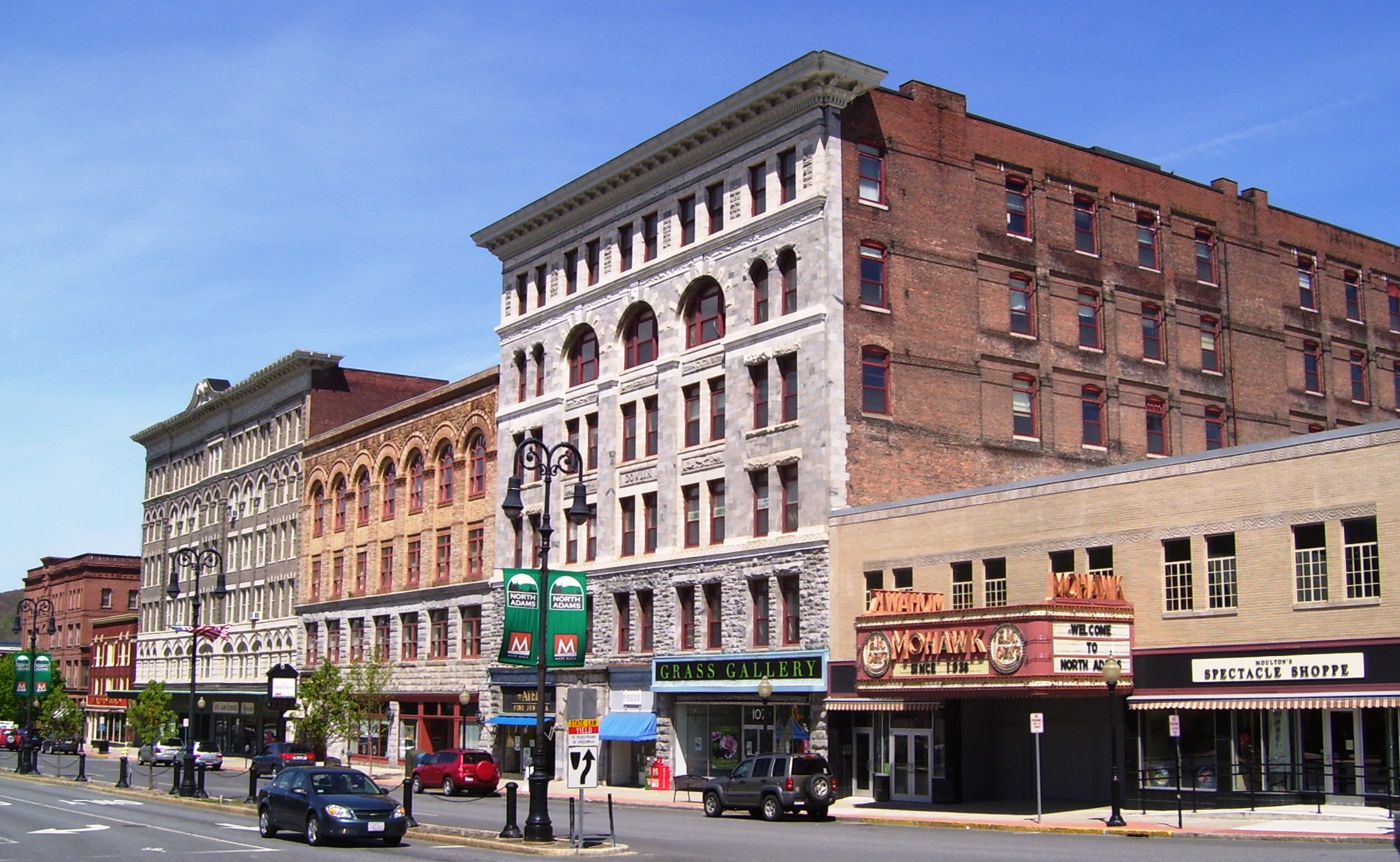
- Main Street between Eagle and Holden Streets is within the district

- Location within Massachusetts Location within the United States
- Location: North Adams, Massachusetts
- Coordinates: 42°41′48″N 73°6′40″W
- Area: 6 acres (2.4 ha) (original); 200 acres (81 ha) (after 1983 increase)
- Architect: various
- Architectural style: various
- MPS: North Adams MRA
- NRHP reference No.: 72000132 (original); 85003623 (increase)

Significant dates
- Added to NRHP: June 19, 1972
- Boundary increase: August 25, 1988

The Monument Square–Eagle Street Historic District is a historic district encompassing the civic heart of North Adams, Massachusetts. When it was originally designated in 1972, the district encompassed Monument Square – west of the intersection of Main Street and Church Street, and the location of a Civil War memorial – and the area around it. This designation included the North Adams Public Library (formerly the Blackinton Mansion), the First Baptist Church and First Congregational Church, and a block of shops on Eagle Street. In 1988, the district's boundaries were increased to be roughly bounded by Holden, Center and Union Streets, Drury High School (now Colgrove Park Elementary School), Summer Street, and Main Street. This expansion extended the district westward along Summer Street to include the US Post Office building and St. John's Church, and eastward to include Colgrove Park, the middle school, and St. Francis Catholic Church. An additional block of commercial buildings were also added on the north side of West Main Street, extending just west of Holden Street.

North Adams was settled as part of Adams in the mid-18th century, and soon developed as an industrial village, powered by the waters of the two branches of the Hoosic River, which meet just northwest of its central business district. The waterfront areas were developed with mills producing a variety of goods, which were eventually dominated by textiles beginning in the mid-19th century. The central business district around Monument Square, where the town's Baptist Church was founded in 1808, led by Otis Blackinton, whose family would dominate the local industrial business landscape. Most of the city's business district was developed between about 1870 and 1920, the greatest period of its economic success. A major decline was begun by the Great Depression, resulting in little growth in subsequent decades.

== See also ==
- National Register of Historic Places listings in Berkshire County, Massachusetts
