= Freeman's Grove Historic District =

Historic district in Massachusetts, United States

- U.S. National Register of Historic Places
- U.S. Historic district
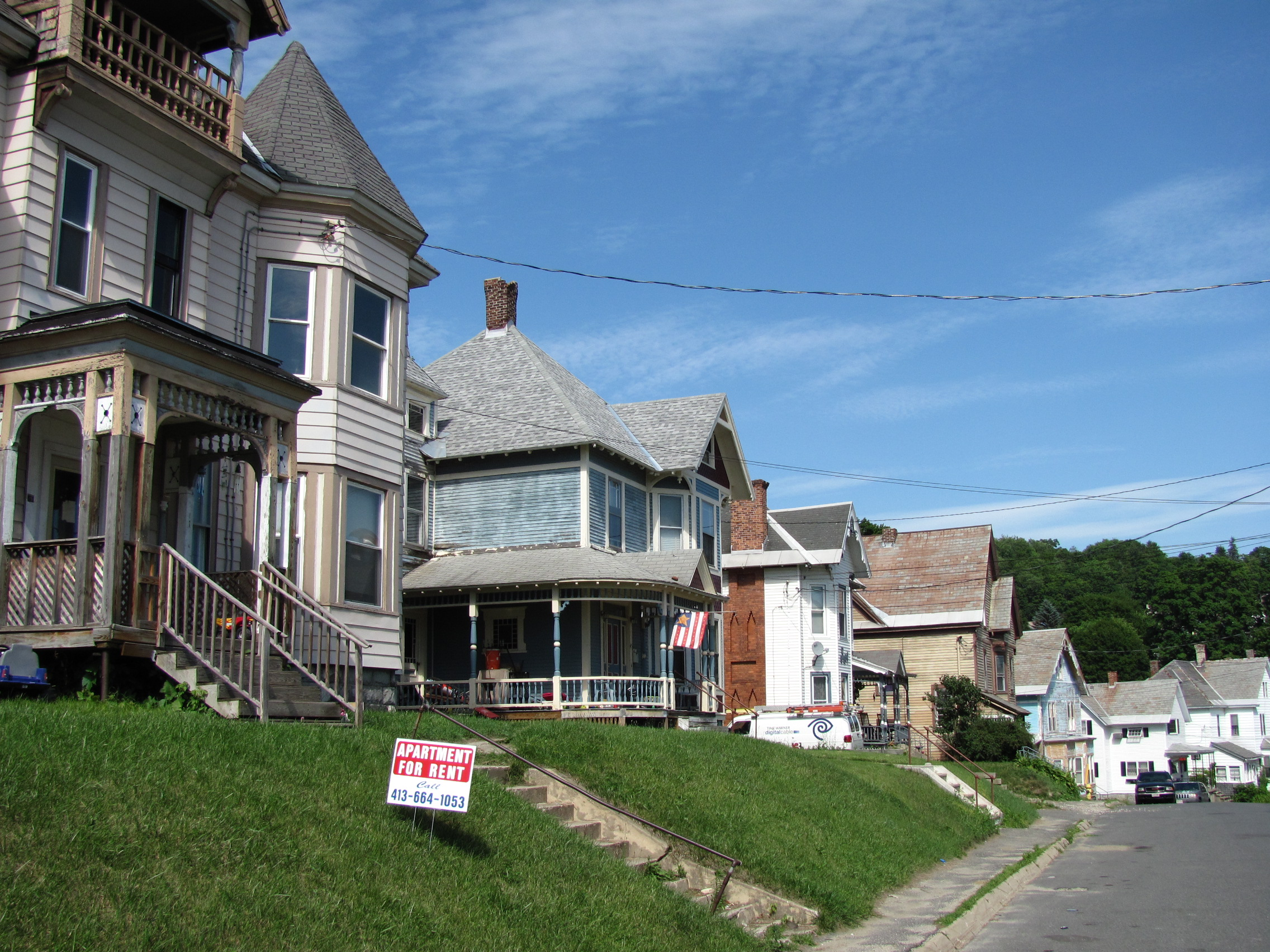
- Bracewell Avenue (2010)

- Location within Massachusetts Location within the United States
- Location: Roughly bounded by Liberty St., Eagle St., Bracewell Ave., and Houghton St., North Adams, Massachusetts
- Coordinates: 42°42′14″N 73°6′39″W
- Area: 250 acres (100 ha)
- Architect: various
- Architectural style: Colonial Revival, Greek Revival, Late Victorian
- MPS: North Adams MRA
- NRHP reference No.: 85003388
- Added to NRHP: October 25, 1985

The Freeman's Grove Historic District is a residential historic district in North Adams, Massachusetts. It encompasses a neighborhood north of the city center that is a well-preserved instance of a working class area developed during its industrial heyday in the late 19th century. It includes the Chase Hill Estate as well as all the houses on Chase Avenue, Bracewell Street, Hall Street and several smaller streets adjacent to those. It is roughly bounded by Liberty Street, Eagle Street, Bracewell Avenues and Houghton Street. The district was listed on the National Register of Historic Places in 1985.

== Description and history ==
The Freeman's Grove neighborhood is located north of downtown North Adams, on the hills rising north of the east-west flowing North Branch Hoosic River.

Named after the Freeman Grove Manufacturing Company, the neighborhood combined raw houses built for the company’s workers aside spacious Victorian homes for the upper classes The housing stock in the district includes single- and multiple-family homes, built in a variety of architectural styles. There are only a small number of houses that were built before the boom of the late 19th century, most of which are in a Greek Revival style. Most of the housing in the district was built between 1887 and 1894.

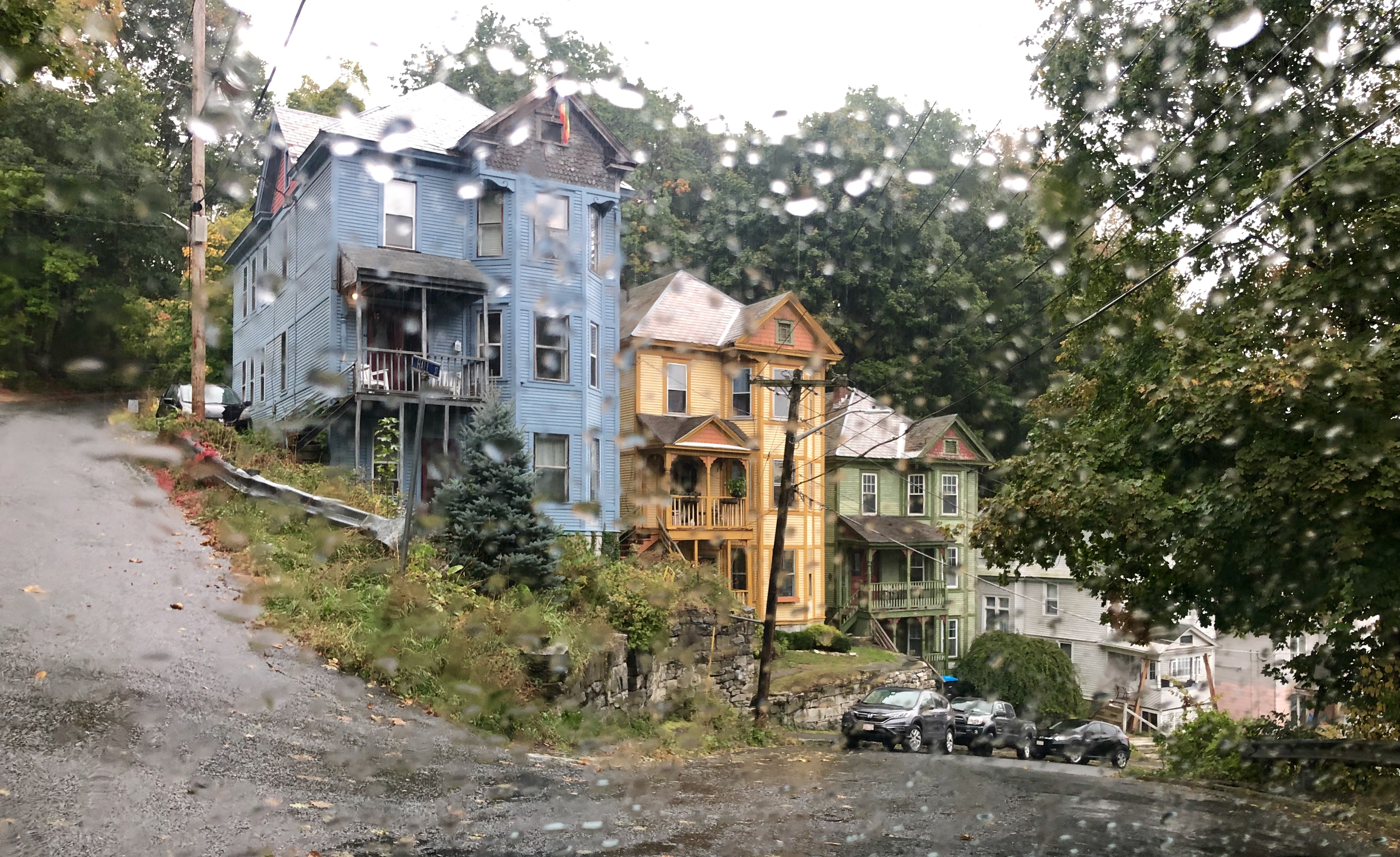
Rainy Day, North Adams

Eagle Street, which forms the district's eastern boundary, is a historic road leading north from the city center, and its west side is where some of the district's oldest buildings are found. The Haynes House at 175 Eagle Street was built about 1840, and is one of the largest and most architecturally sophisticated houses in the district. Nearby are two Italianate houses, one of which is a late example of the style (built 1889). A few of the district's houses were built from mail-order plans; the Stick style house at 39 Hall Street is one example of this type, coming from a pattern book published in Tennessee, and several duplexes appear to be based on the designs of Palliser, Palliser & Company, a prominent publisher of such designs from Bridgeport, Connecticut.

1980s

The neighborhood went through a particularly rough time in the 1980s. Ramshackle housing, litter, vandalism, alcoholism, drugs, and absentee landlords were a common problem in the area. In the early 1990s, members of the community formed an action plan to restore the neighborhood to its past state. The residents united under the name ‘UNO’ (United Neighborhood Organization). The goals of UNO were to increase respect for the neighborhood, improve the environment, and educate residents about drug and alcohol prevention.

1990s

In 1994, a Community Policing program began as an effort to have police and communities work together. Police attended monthly meetings and took note of the concerns that residents had. 1998 saw another positive change as funding from the Mayor’s office brought in a new playground. Some older, unsafe buildings were torn down to make room, and the playground was built by the efforts of many people, including a Williamstown construction team from the International Institute for Cooperation and Development, volunteers from the Massachusetts College of Liberal Arts (MCLA), and local residents.

2000s

The Porches Inn, built in 2001, had a further dramatic impact on the community. Initially seen as a building that could spruce-up the neighborhood, the hotel also created controversy among the long-time residents. Some consider it an unwanted intrusion that has bulldozed former homes and done little to improve the other homes in the surrounding area, while others view it as a welcome addition to the community, returning some of the former richness and beauty to the area.

Spearheaded by local community activist Shirley Davis, in the past two decades, Freeman Grove Historic District has entered into a new transformation phase. The collaboration between UNO, the city, Massachusetts Museum of Contemporary Art and John "Jack" Wadsworth and his wife, Susy, owners of the Porches, had revitalized this somewhat rundown corner of the city into a welcoming center for visitors and residents alike that now attracts young families and artists.

2010

In 2018, the UNO Community Center opened in a former tavern on River Street. Purchased and renovated by Wadsworth — what he calls "impact investing" — the center provided the first permanent home for the neighborhood group founded by Shirley Davis in 1990.

In addition, Wadsworth has purchased three corners of the River, Marshall and Houghton streets intersection: The new park next to the UNO center and another parcel across Houghton Street, as well as a former pool supply company on Marshall.

The second park on Houghton and River, and next to the existing city field and playground, is nearly complete and will include a grassy amphitheater, a pagoda and a place for screening movies.

Most recently, the Brooklyn based musical collective Floating Tower, led by composer Mátti Kovler, purchased the Chase Hill Estate with long term prospects of creating an artist retreat for refugee musicians and doing work with local community.

== See also ==
- National Register of Historic Places listings in Berkshire County, Massachusetts
