= Hathaway Tenement =

- U.S. National Register of Historic Places
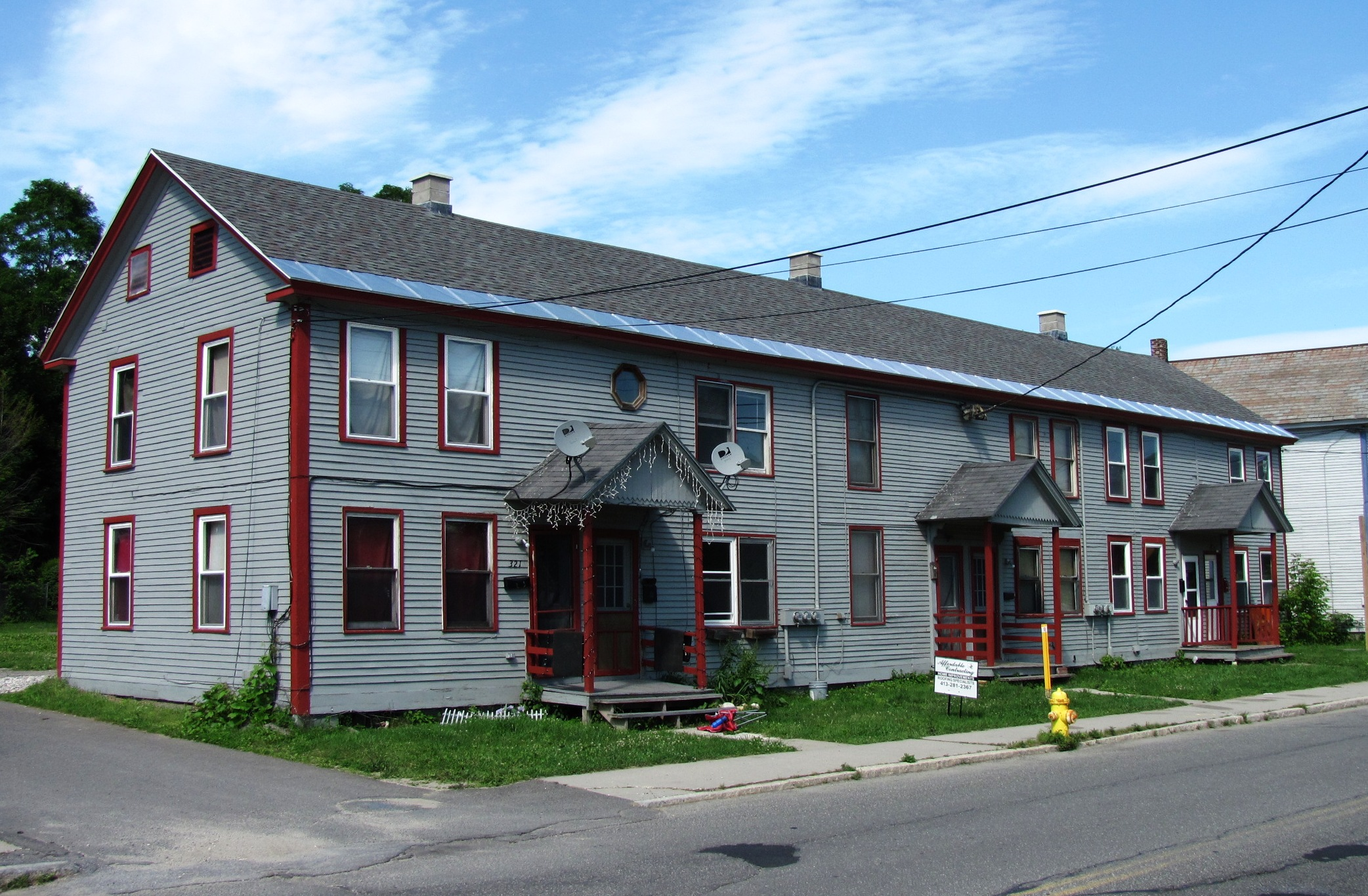
- (2010)

- Location within Massachusetts Location within the United States
- Location: 311–321 River Street, North Adams, Massachusetts
- Coordinates: 42°42′13″N 73°7′12″W
- Built: 1850
- Architectural style: Greek Revival
- MPS: North Adams MRA
- NRHP reference No.: 85003415
- Added to NRHP: October 25, 1985

The Hathaway Tenement is a historic tenement house located in North Adams, Massachusetts. A row of six apartment units, it was built in about 1850, and is a rare surviving example of worker housing dating to the early period of North Adams' industrial development. It was added to the National Register of Historic Places in 1985.

== Description and history ==
The Hathaway Tenement is located just northwest of central North Adams, on the north side of River Street just west of its junction with Loftus Street. It is a long two-story wood-frame structure, with a gabled roof and clapboarded exterior. It consists of six rowhouses, each three bays wide, with entrances set in pairs under gable-roofed porches. Windows are one-over-one sash, with most set singly in rectangular openings. In one of the central units, one bay of windows has been sided over. The styling is basically a vernacular Greek Revival, with flat cornerboards and short returns on the building's gable ends.

The building dates to the first period of industrialization in North Adams: River Street was laid out in 1836, and over the next decade, ten mills were built along the opposite banks of the Hoosac River. The building is named for Nathaniel Hathaway, one of the mill proprietors, and is one of two identical buildings that are among the worker housing units they built. (The other building originally stood next door, was extensively altered in the 20th century, and has subsequently been demolished.) When Hathaway retired from the mill partnership, he and his wife occupied one of the units in this building. It was later owned by another mill proprietor, T.F. Loftus, who probably added the porches and made other alterations.

== See also ==
- National Register of Historic Places listings in Berkshire County, Massachusetts
