= Wells House (North Adams, Massachusetts) =

Historic house in Massachusetts, United States

- U.S. National Register of Historic Places
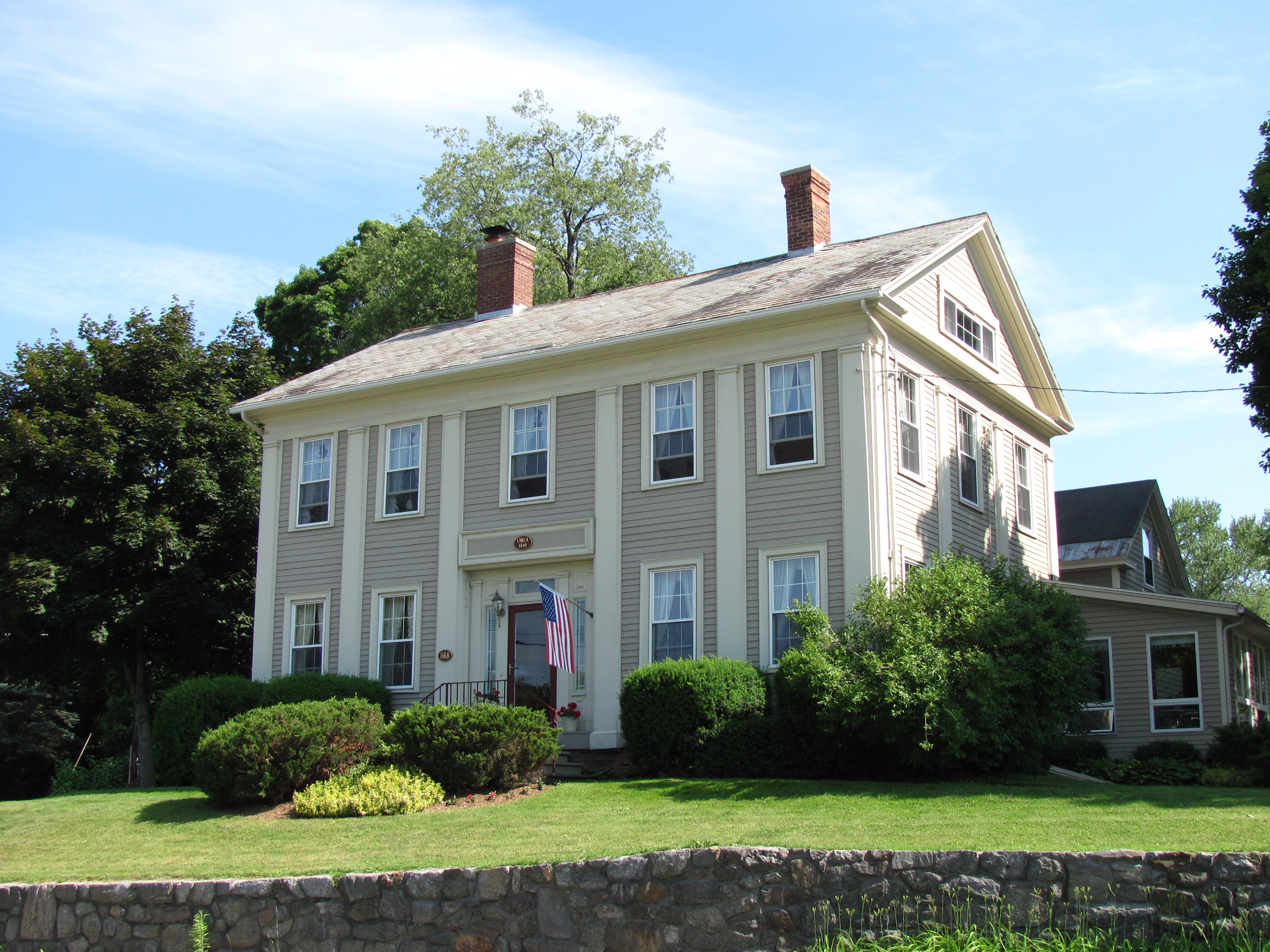
- (2010)

- Location within Massachusetts Location within the United States
- Location: 568 West Main St., North Adams, Massachusetts
- Coordinates: 42°41′54″N 73°8′5″W
- Area: less than one acre
- Built: c. 1840
- Architectural style: Greek Revival
- MPS: North Adams MRA
- NRHP reference No.: 85003393
- Added to NRHP: October 25, 1985

The Wells House is a historic house located in North Adams, Massachusetts. Built about 1840, it is a locally rare surviving example of a Greek Revival farmhouse. It was added to the National Register of Historic Places in 1985.

== Description and history ==
The Wells House is located in the West End of North Adams, at the southwest corner of West Main Street (Massachusetts Route 2) and Notch Road. It is a 2 1/2-story wood-frame structure, with a gabled roof, interior brick chimneys, and a clapboarded exterior. Its bays on three sides are articulated by two-story Doric pilasters, which rise to an entablature below the cornice. The gable ends on the sides are fully pedimented. The main facade is five bays wide, with the center entrance set in a recess with flanking sidelight windows and pilasters, and a transom window above.

The house was built in about 1840 and is one of the city's oldest Greek Revival buildings. It was built for Orson Wells, who first settled in North Adams in the 1810s and established an acid production facility nearby. The Welles were also involved in textile production that developed in nearby Braytonville. They also owned much land in the area, even as it industrialized; around the turn of the 20th century, the family still owned 160 acres (65 ha) of farmland. This land was eventually developed, but the Wells house remained in the family until 1968.

== See also ==
- National Register of Historic Places listings in Berkshire County, Massachusetts
