= North Adams, Massachusetts =

North Adams
- City
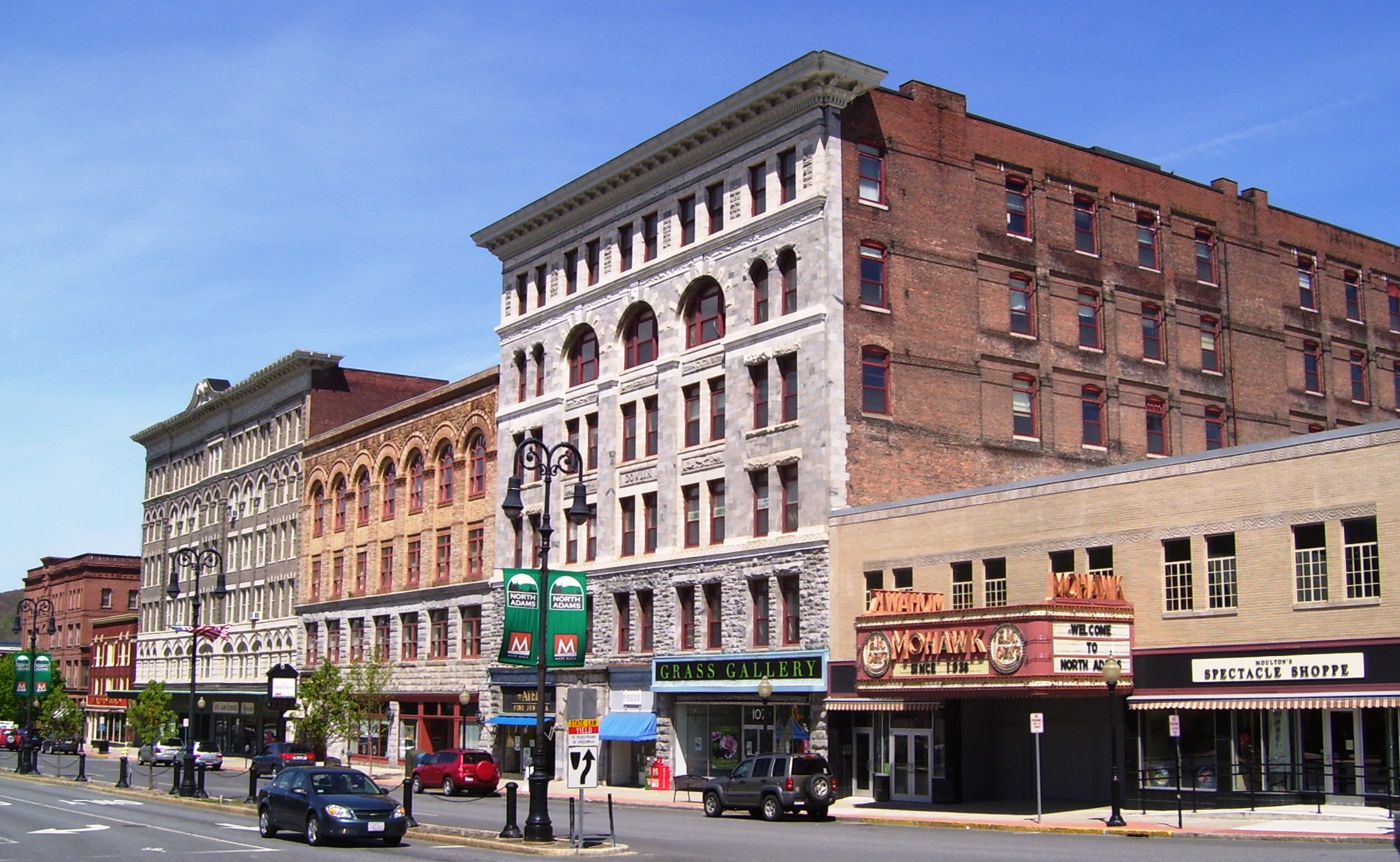
- Main Street

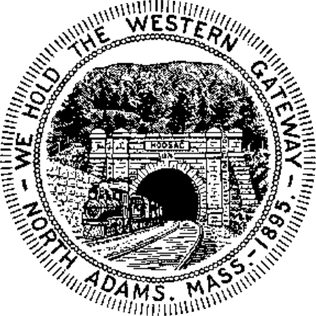
- Seal
- Nicknames: Tunnel City and Steeple City
- Motto: "We Hold the Western Gateway"
- Location in Berkshire County and the state of Massachusetts.

- Location in the United States
- Coordinates: 42°42′N 73°7′W
- Country: United States
- Commonwealth: Massachusetts
- County: Berkshire
- Settled: 1745
- Incorporated: 1878 (Town)
- Incorporated: 1895 (City)

Government
  - Type: Mayor-council city
  - Mayor: Jennifer Macksey

Area
  - Total: 20.61 sq mi (53.39 km^{2})
  - Land: 20.35 sq mi (52.70 km^{2})
  - Water: 0.27 sq mi (0.69 km^{2})
- Elevation: 705 ft (215 m)

Population (2020)
  - Total: 12,961
  - Density: 637.0/sq mi (245.95/km^{2})
- Time zone: UTC-5 (Eastern)
  - Summer (DST): UTC-4 (Eastern)
- ZIP code: 01247
- Area code: 413
- FIPS code: 25-46225
- GNIS feature ID: 0607610
- Website: www.northadams-ma.gov

North Adams is a city in Berkshire County, Massachusetts, United States. It is part of the Pittsfield, Massachusetts Metropolitan Statistical Area. Its population was 12,961 as of the 2020 census. Best known as the home of the largest contemporary art museum in the United States, the Massachusetts Museum of Contemporary Art, North Adams has in recent years become a center for tourism, culture and recreation.

== History ==
=== Early history ===
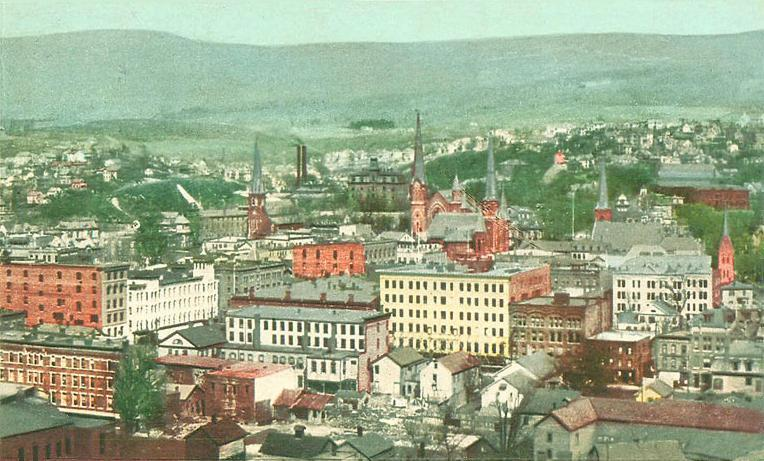
Bird's eye view of North Adams in 1905

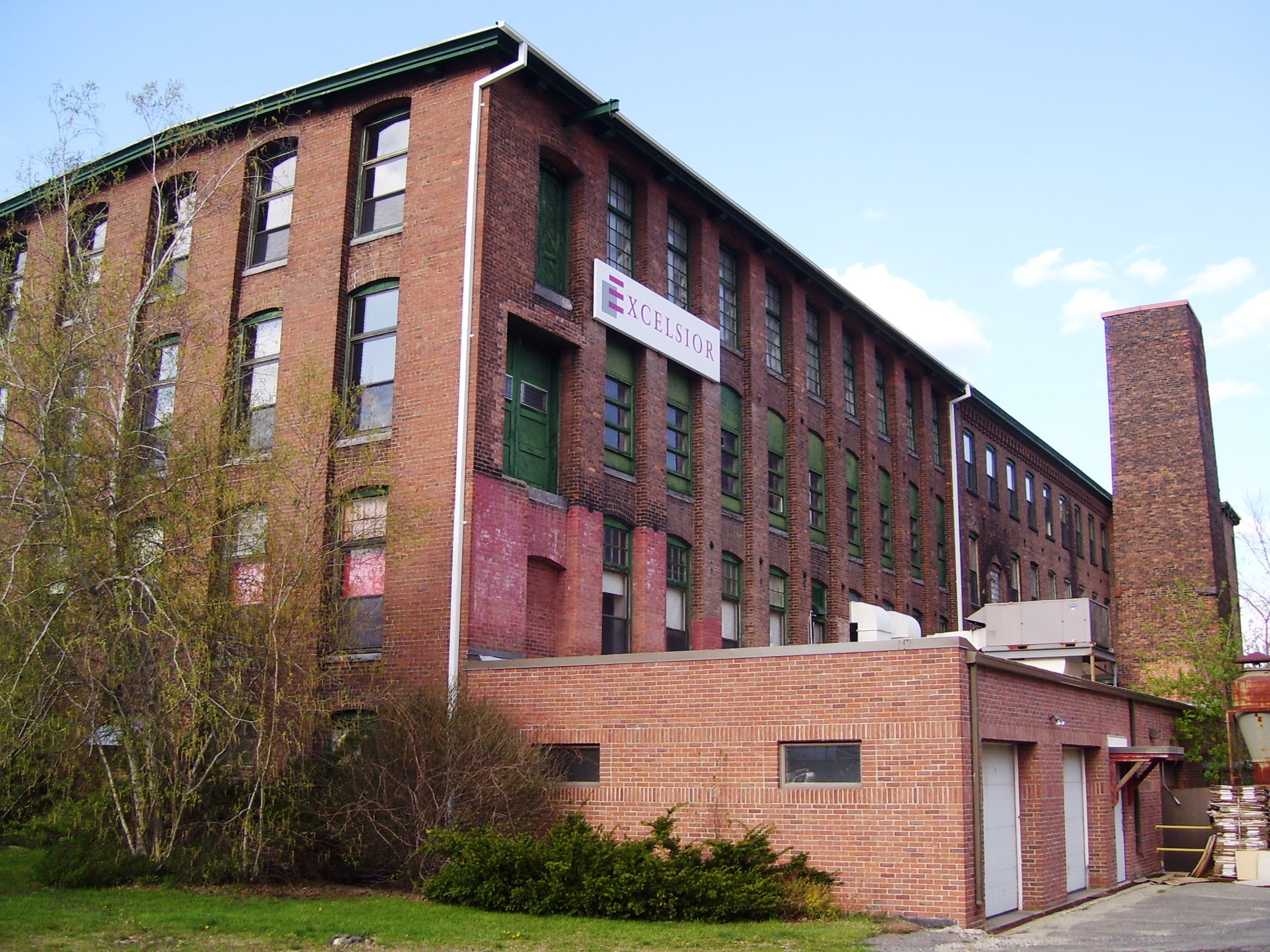
Norad Mill

North Adams was first settled in 1745 during King George's War, when the most western of a line of defensive forts was built along the bank of the Hoosic River, and occupied by Massachusetts militiamen and their families. During the war, Canadian and Native American forces laid siege to Fort Massachusetts and 30 prisoners were taken to Quebec; half died in captivity. In 1747 Fort Massachusetts was rebuilt with improved defenses, but was never attacked again. In a period of peace following the Treaty of Aix-la-Chapelle, many of the soldiers who had been garrisoned at the fort turned to farming instead by opting to each take a 190-acre package of nearby land in lieu of back-pay in the nearby township of West Hoosac (now known as Williamstown).

The North Adams Women's Club began raising funds in 1895 to reconstruct the fort as a memorial site. It was dedicated in 1933 and operated as a historical tourist site until the 1960s. The 1933 Fort's replica chimney is located at the rear of the Central Markets Supermarket that opened at the site in 1960 and closed in 2016 as a Price Chopper Supermarket. The historic site was conveyed to the City of North Adams by the Golub family in 2017.

The town was incorporated separately from Adams in 1878, and reincorporated as a city in 1895. The city is named in honor of Samuel Adams, a leader in the American Revolution, signer of the Declaration of Independence, and governor of Massachusetts.

For much of its history, North Adams was a mill town. Manufacturing began in the city before the Revolutionary War, largely because the confluence of the Hoosic River's two branches provided water power for small-scale industry. By the late 1700s and early 1800s, businesses included wholesale shoe manufacturers; a brick yard; a saw mill; cabinet-makers; hat manufacturers; machine shops for the construction of mill machines; marble works; wagon and sleigh-makers; and an ironworks, which provided the pig iron for armor plates on the Civil War ship, the Monitor.

Expansion westwards started with the creation of three mill villages, Blackinton in 1821, Greylock in 1846 and Braytonville in 1832, located to take advantage of the Hoosac River's water power. The 1850 census marked the official shift of the town from agriculture to industry, since more factory workers than farmers now resided in the town. In 1870 the use of Chinese strikebreakers from California to break the North Adams strike at the Sampson Shoe Factory (today part of the Mass MoCA complex) was an important step in the movement of Chinese from the west coast to the east coast, resulting in east coast Chinatowns in the United States. On a national scale, the North Adams strike became known as the primary trigger to the passage of the Chinese Exclusion Act by the U.S. Congress in 1882.

North Adams was also the headquarters for building the Hoosac Tunnel starting in 1851 and completed in 1874, adding an east–west connection to Boston and Albany to the existing 1842 rail connection to New York. Prior to that time, inter-regional travel was limited to weekly stagecoaches from Albany and Greenfield.

Downtown in 1860, Oliver Arnold and Company was established with the latest equipment for printing cloth. Large government contracts to supply fabric for the Union Army helped the business prosper. During the next four decades, Arnold Print Works became one of the world's leading manufacturers of printed textiles. It also became the largest employer in North Adams, with some 3,200 workers by 1905. Despite decades of success, falling cloth prices and the lingering effects of the Great Depression forced the company to close its Marshall Street operation in 1942 and consolidate at smaller facilities in Adams.

=== Sprague Electric ===
Later that year, the Sprague Electric Company bought the former print works site. Sprague physicists, chemists, electrical engineers, and skilled technicians were called upon by the U.S. government during World War II to design and manufacture crucial components of advanced weapons systems, including the atomic bomb.

With state-of-the-art equipment, Sprague was a major research and development center, conducting studies on electricity and semi-conducting materials. After the war, its products were used in the launch systems for NASA's Gemini missions, and by 1966 Sprague employed 4,137 workers in a community of 18,000. From the post-war years to the mid-1980s, Sprague produced electrical components for the booming consumer electronics market, but competition from abroad led to declining sales and, in 1985, the company closed operations on Marshall Street. Its closure devastated the local economy. Unemployment rates rose and population declined.

=== MASS MoCA ===
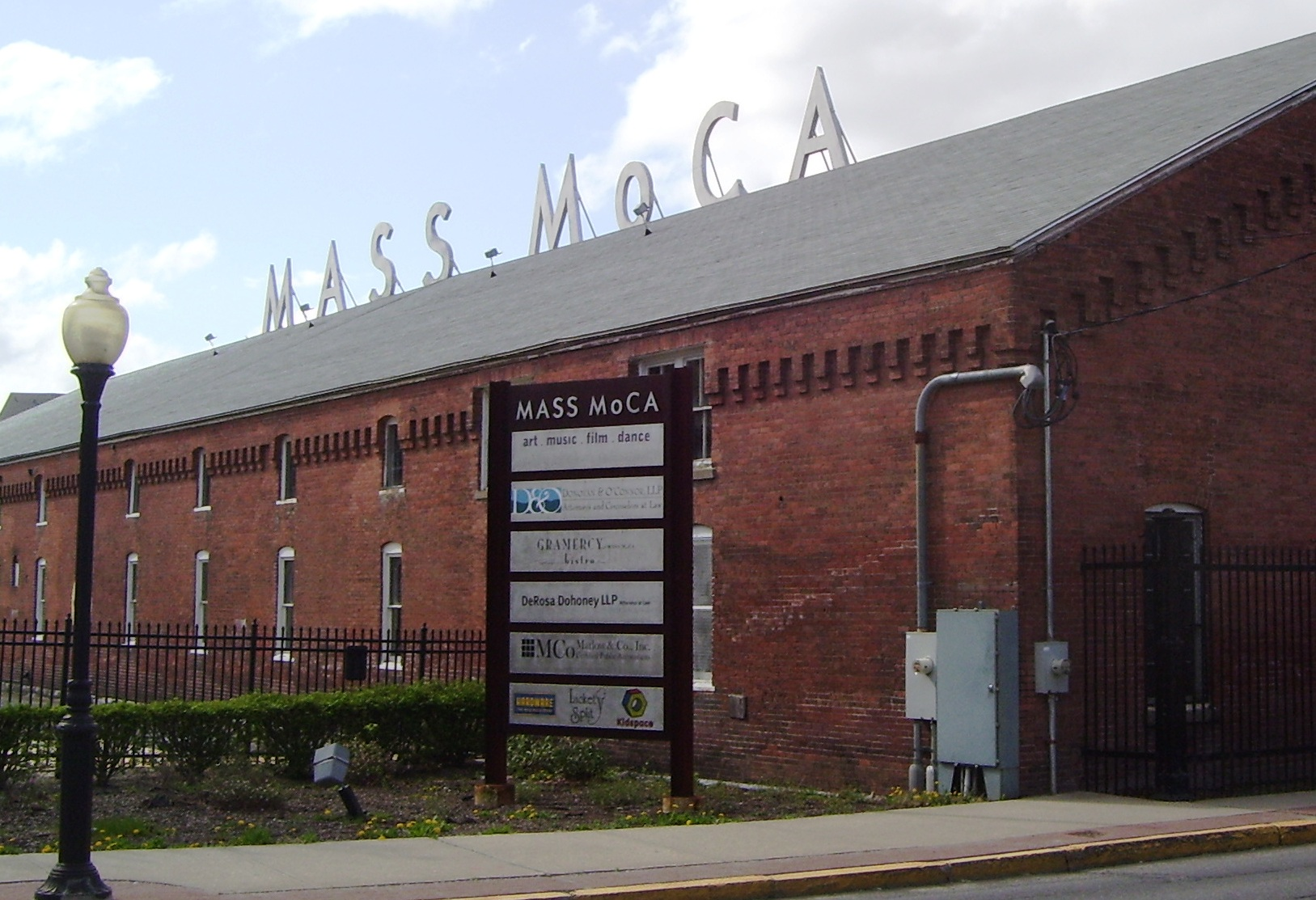
Massachusetts Museum of Contemporary Art (MASS MoCA), formerly Arnold Print Works and a facility of Sprague Electronics

After Sprague closed, business and political leaders in North Adams sought ways to re-use the vast complex. Williams College Museum of Art director Thomas Krens, who would later become Director of the Guggenheim, was looking for space to exhibit large works of contemporary art that would not fit in conventional museum galleries. When mayor John Barrett III (serving 1984–2009) suggested the vast Marshall Street complex as a possible exhibition site, the idea of creating a contemporary arts center in North Adams began to take shape.

The campaign to build support for the proposed institution, which would serve as a platform for presenting contemporary art and developing links to the region's other cultural institutions, began in earnest. The Massachusetts legislature announced its support for the project in 1988. Subsequent economic upheaval threatened the project, but broad-based support from the community and the private sector, which pledged more than $8 million, ensured that it moved forward. The eventual proposal used the scale and versatility of the industrial spaces to link the facility's past and its new life as the country's largest center for contemporary visual and performing arts.

Since it opened, the Massachusetts Museum of Contemporary Art (MASS MoCA) has been part of a larger economic transformation in the region based on cultural, recreational, and educational offerings. North Adams has become home for several new restaurants, contemporary art galleries, and cultural organizations. In addition, once-shuttered area factories and mills have been rehabilitated as lofts for artists to live and work in.

== Geography ==
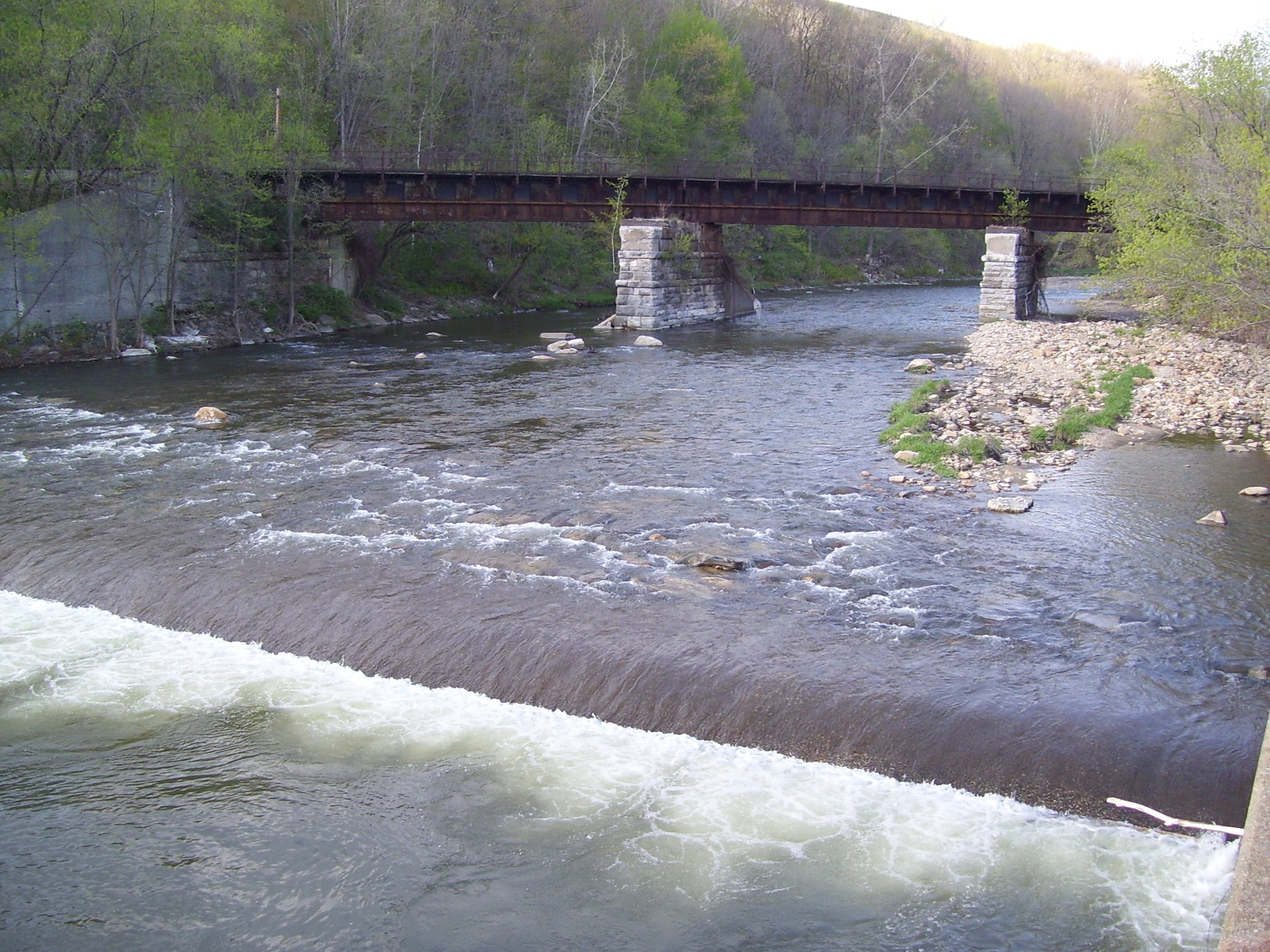
The Hoosic River flows through the city and was essential to its growth, providing power for the mills built along its banks as well as those of its branches.

According to the United States Census Bureau, North Adams has a total area of 20.6 square miles (53.4 km^{2}), of which 20.3 square miles (52.7 km^{2}) is land and 0.27 square miles (0.7 km^{2}), or 1.31%, is water. North Adams is bordered by Clarksburg to the north, Florida to the east, Adams to the south, and Williamstown to the west.

North Adams is located in the valley created by the Hoosic River, which has been walled and floored with concrete in portions to prevent floods. The city's Natural Bridge State Park contains the only natural white marble bridge in North America. Formed by glacial melt by 11,000 BCE, the arch and abandoned quarry have long attracted attention from hikers, including Nathaniel Hawthorne in 1838, who wrote of it (among other local features) in his An American Notebook. To the east, the city is bordered by the western face of the Hoosac Range, with visibility on its West Summit extending throughout the tri-state area. To the southwest, the city has the northern end of Mount Greylock State Reservation, ending at Mount Williams, which at 2,951 feet (899 m) above sea level is the highest point in the city. The Appalachian Trail passes through the western part of the city, crossing the summit of Mount Williams and briefly passing through Williamstown before heading north towards Vermont.

=== Climate ===
North Adams has a humid continental climate (Dfb). Winters can be harsh, with temperatures dropping to 0 °F (−18 °C) or colder nine times per year. Summers are warm and pleasant, with temperatures at or above 90 °F (32 °C) four times per year. The record high is 96 °F (36 °C), recorded on July 8, 1988, and the record low is −20 °F (−29 °C), recorded on January 24, 2011 and February 6, 2015. On average, 153 days see measurable precipitation per year.

Climate data for North Adams, MA (1991–2020 normals, extremes 1987–present)
| Month | Jan | Feb | Mar | Apr | May | Jun | Jul | Aug | Sep | Oct | Nov | Dec | Year |
|---|---|---|---|---|---|---|---|---|---|---|---|---|---|
| Record high °F (°C) | 68 (20) | 76 (24) | 87 (31) | 90 (32) | 92 (33) | 93 (34) | 96 (36) | 94 (34) | 92 (33) | 84 (29) | 77 (25) | 70 (21) | 96 (36) |
| Mean daily maximum °F (°C) | 32.4 (0.2) | 35.3 (1.8) | 43.6 (6.4) | 56.9 (13.8) | 68.6 (20.3) | 76.4 (24.7) | 80.9 (27.2) | 79.0 (26.1) | 72.1 (22.3) | 60.0 (15.6) | 48.4 (9.1) | 37.6 (3.1) | 57.6 (14.2) |
| Daily mean °F (°C) | 23.3 (−4.8) | 25.4 (−3.7) | 33.5 (0.8) | 45.2 (7.3) | 56.2 (13.4) | 64.7 (18.2) | 69.3 (20.7) | 67.5 (19.7) | 60.5 (15.8) | 49.2 (9.6) | 39.1 (3.9) | 29.5 (−1.4) | 46.9 (8.3) |
| Mean daily minimum °F (°C) | 14.3 (−9.8) | 15.5 (−9.2) | 23.5 (−4.7) | 33.5 (0.8) | 43.9 (6.6) | 53.0 (11.7) | 57.7 (14.3) | 56.1 (13.4) | 48.8 (9.3) | 38.4 (3.6) | 29.7 (−1.3) | 21.5 (−5.8) | 36.3 (2.4) |
| Record low °F (°C) | −20 (−29) | −20 (−29) | −14 (−26) | 0 (−18) | 23 (−5) | 33 (1) | 43 (6) | 38 (3) | 28 (−2) | 18 (−8) | 1 (−17) | −12 (−24) | −20 (−29) |
| Average precipitation inches (mm) | 2.52 (64) | 1.97 (50) | 3.08 (78) | 3.12 (79) | 3.73 (95) | 4.41 (112) | 4.13 (105) | 4.47 (114) | 4.22 (107) | 4.28 (109) | 3.25 (83) | 3.12 (79) | 42.30 (1,074) |
| Average precipitation days (≥ 0.01 in) | 11 | 10 | 12 | 13 | 14 | 15 | 14 | 14 | 12 | 13 | 12 | 13 | 153 |
Source: NOAA

== Demographics ==
Historical population
| Year | Pop. | ±% |
|---|---|---|
| 1880 | 10,191 | — |
| 1890 | 16,074 | +57.7% |
| 1900 | 24,200 | +50.6% |
| 1910 | 22,019 | −9.0% |
| 1920 | 22,282 | +1.2% |
| 1930 | 21,621 | −3.0% |
| 1940 | 22,213 | +2.7% |
| 1950 | 21,567 | −2.9% |
| 1960 | 19,905 | −7.7% |
| 1970 | 19,195 | −3.6% |
| 1980 | 18,063 | −5.9% |
| 1990 | 16,797 | −7.0% |
| 2000 | 14,681 | −12.6% |
| 2010 | 13,708 | −6.6% |
| 2020 | 12,961 | −5.4% |
| 2022* | 12,777 | −1.4% |
* = population estimate. Source: United States Census records and Population Estimates Program data. Source: U.S. Decennial Census

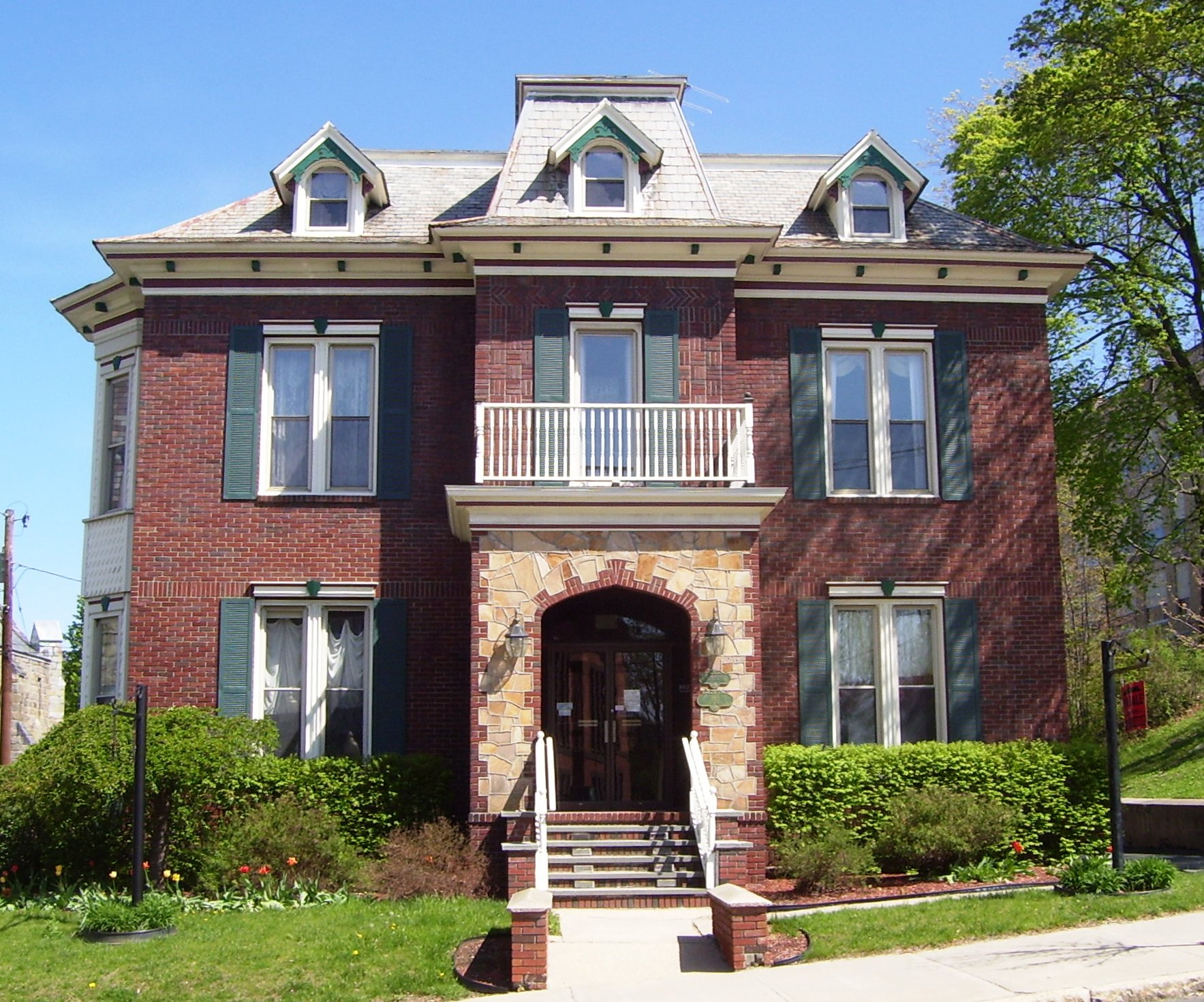
House on East Main Street

=== 2020 census ===
As of the 2020 census, North Adams had a population of 12,961. The median age was 42.6 years. 17.2% of residents were under the age of 18 and 20.4% of residents were 65 years of age or older. For every 100 females there were 93.3 males, and for every 100 females age 18 and over there were 90.9 males age 18 and over.

88.9% of residents lived in urban areas, while 11.1% lived in rural areas.

There were 5,888 households in North Adams, of which 20.7% had children under the age of 18 living in them. Of all households, 30.9% were married-couple households, 24.6% were households with a male householder and no spouse or partner present, and 33.9% were households with a female householder and no spouse or partner present. About 41.3% of all households were made up of individuals and 17.6% had someone living alone who was 65 years of age or older.

There were 6,871 housing units, of which 14.3% were vacant. The homeowner vacancy rate was 1.8% and the rental vacancy rate was 6.7%.

Racial composition as of the 2020 census
| Race | Number | Percent |
|---|---|---|
| White | 11,308 | 87.2% |
| Black or African American | 338 | 2.6% |
| American Indian and Alaska Native | 38 | 0.3% |
| Asian | 100 | 0.8% |
| Native Hawaiian and Other Pacific Islander | 2 | 0.0% |
| Some other race | 233 | 1.8% |
| Two or more races | 942 | 7.3% |
| Hispanic or Latino (of any race) | 591 | 4.6% |

=== 2010 census ===
As of the census of 2010, there were 13,708 people, 5,652 households, and 3,156 families residing in the city. The city, which is the smallest in Massachusetts, ranks second (after Pittsfield) out of 32 cities and towns in Berkshire County by population. The population density was 665.4 inhabitants per square mile (256.9/km^{2}), ranking it 2nd in the county. There were 6,523 housing units at an average density of 316.7 per square mile (122.3/km^{2}). The racial makeup of the city was 93.0% White, 1.8% African American, 0.4% Native American, 1.1% Asian, 0.2% Pacific Islander, 0.8% from other races, and 2.8% from two or more races. Hispanic or Latino of any race were 2.4% of the population.

There were 5,652 households, out of which 23.6% had children under the age of 18 living with them, 38.4% were married couples living together, 12.5% had a female householder with no husband present, and 44.2% were non-families. 39.7% of all households were made up of individuals, and 15.0% had someone living alone who was 65 years of age or older. The average household size was 2.21 and the average family size was 2.98.

In the city, the population was spread out, with 21.74% under the age of 18, 16.9% from 18 to 24, 21.4% from 25 to 44, 23.7% from 45 to 64, and 16.4% who were 65 years of age or older. The median age was 38 years. For every 100 females, there were 91.2 males. For every 100 females age 18 and over, there were 89.75 males.

The median income for a household in the city was $35,020, and the median income for a family was $90,000. The per capita income for the city was $19,857. About 9.0% of families and 22.3% of the population were below the poverty line, including 11.0% of those age 20 or over.

== Arts and culture ==
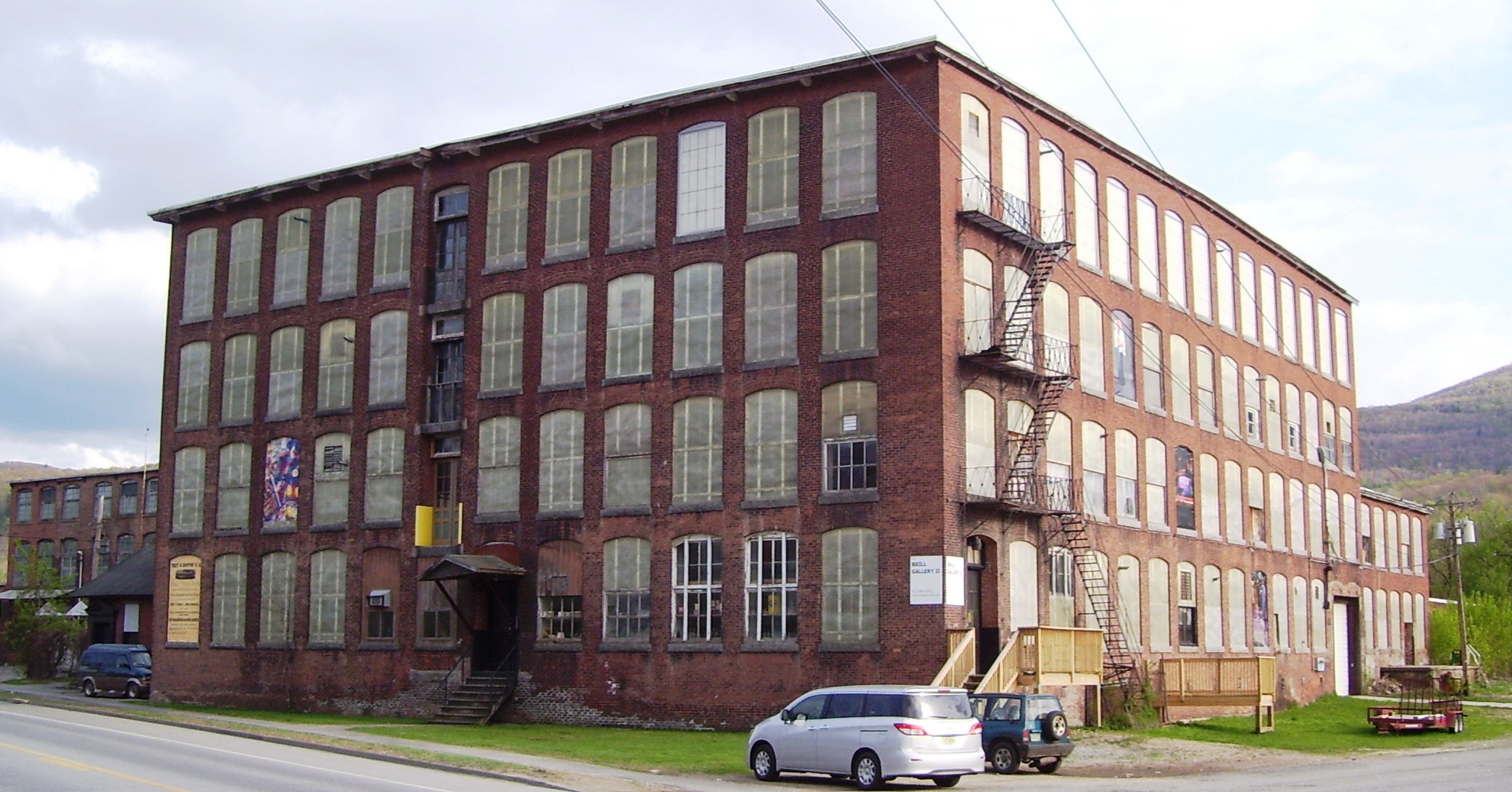
Windows of the Greylock (Cariddi) Mill used as an art gallery

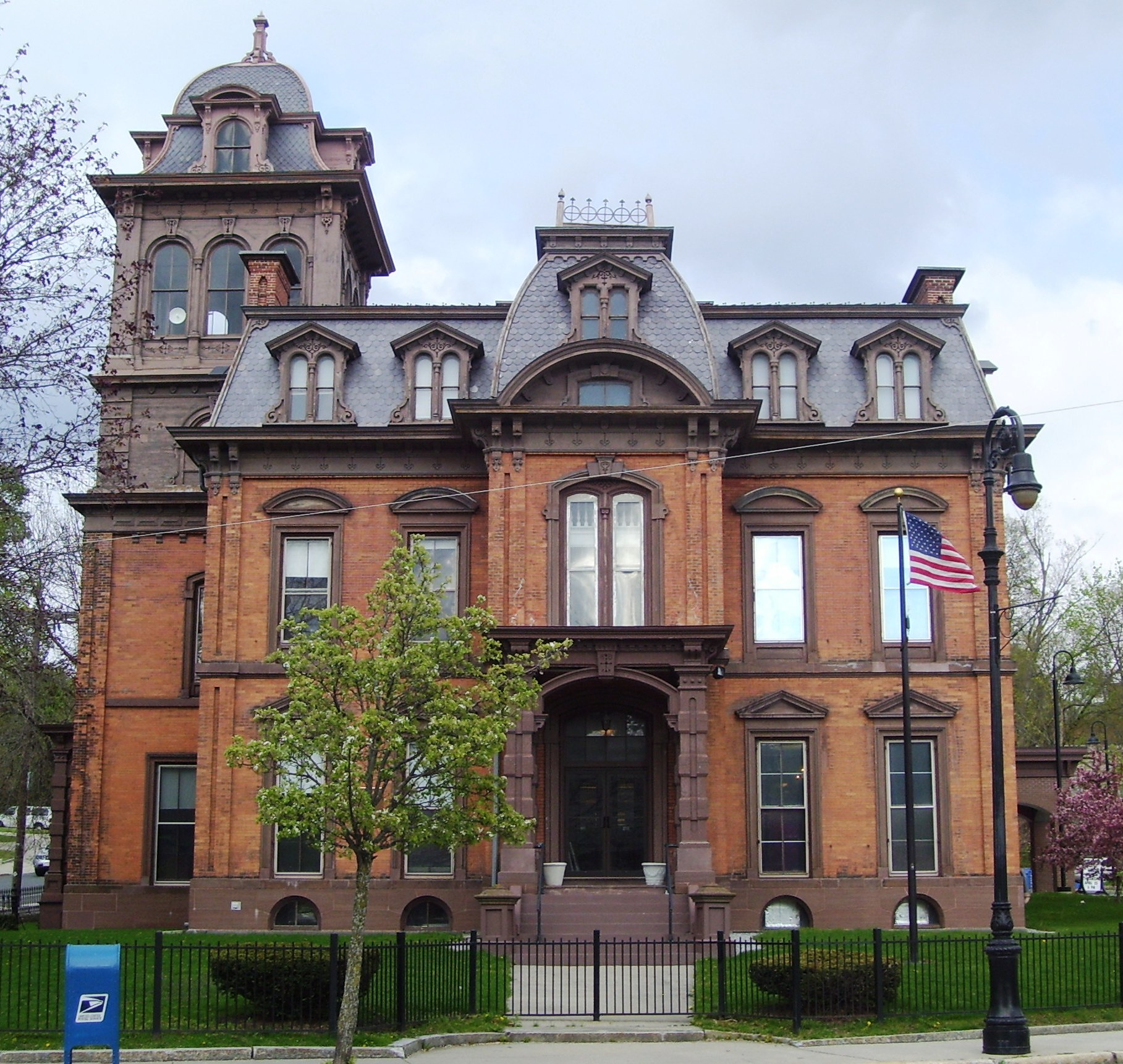
North Adams Public Library, within the Church Street-Caddy Hill Historic District.

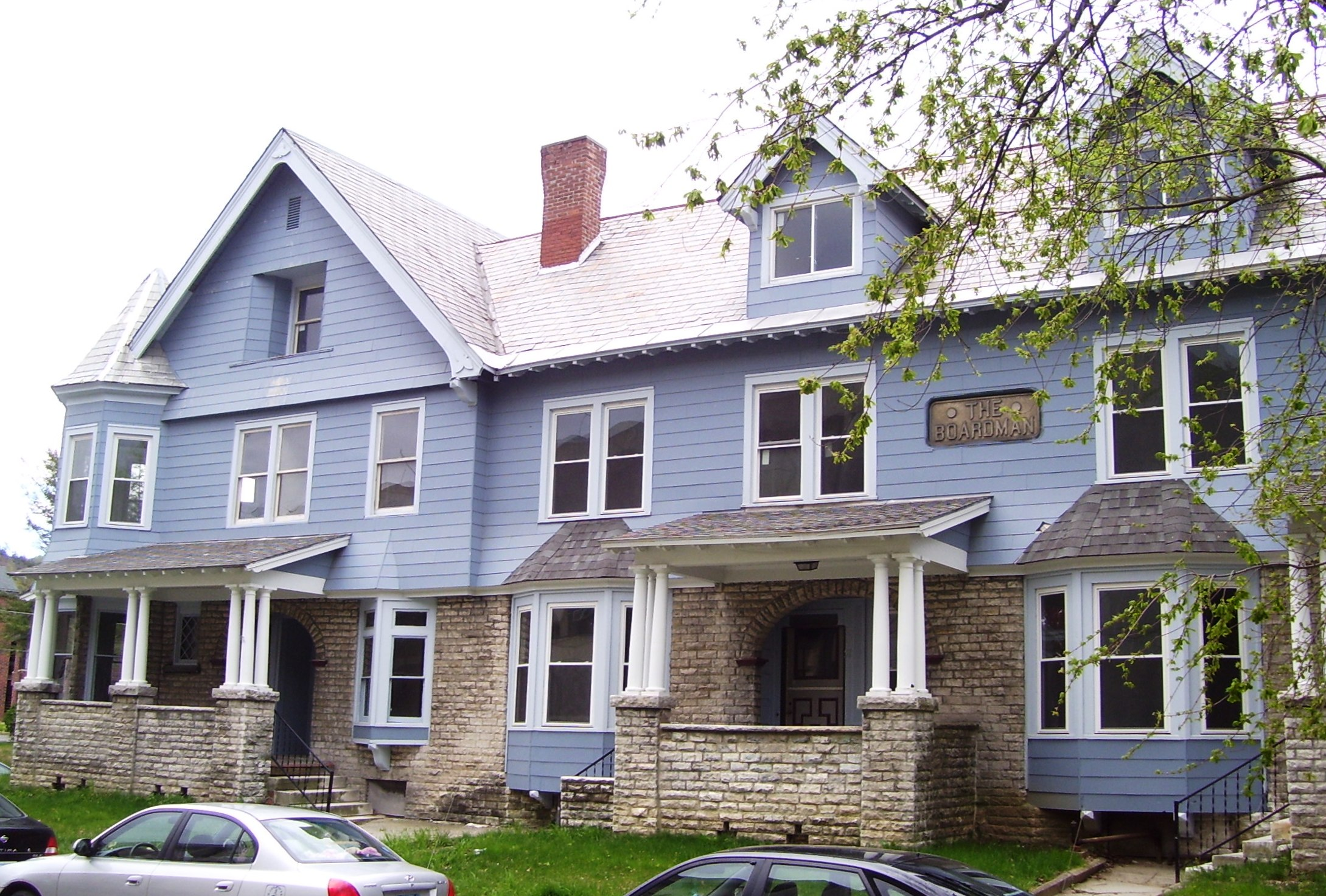
The Boardman apartment buildings were built in 1899 in the Colonial Revival style.

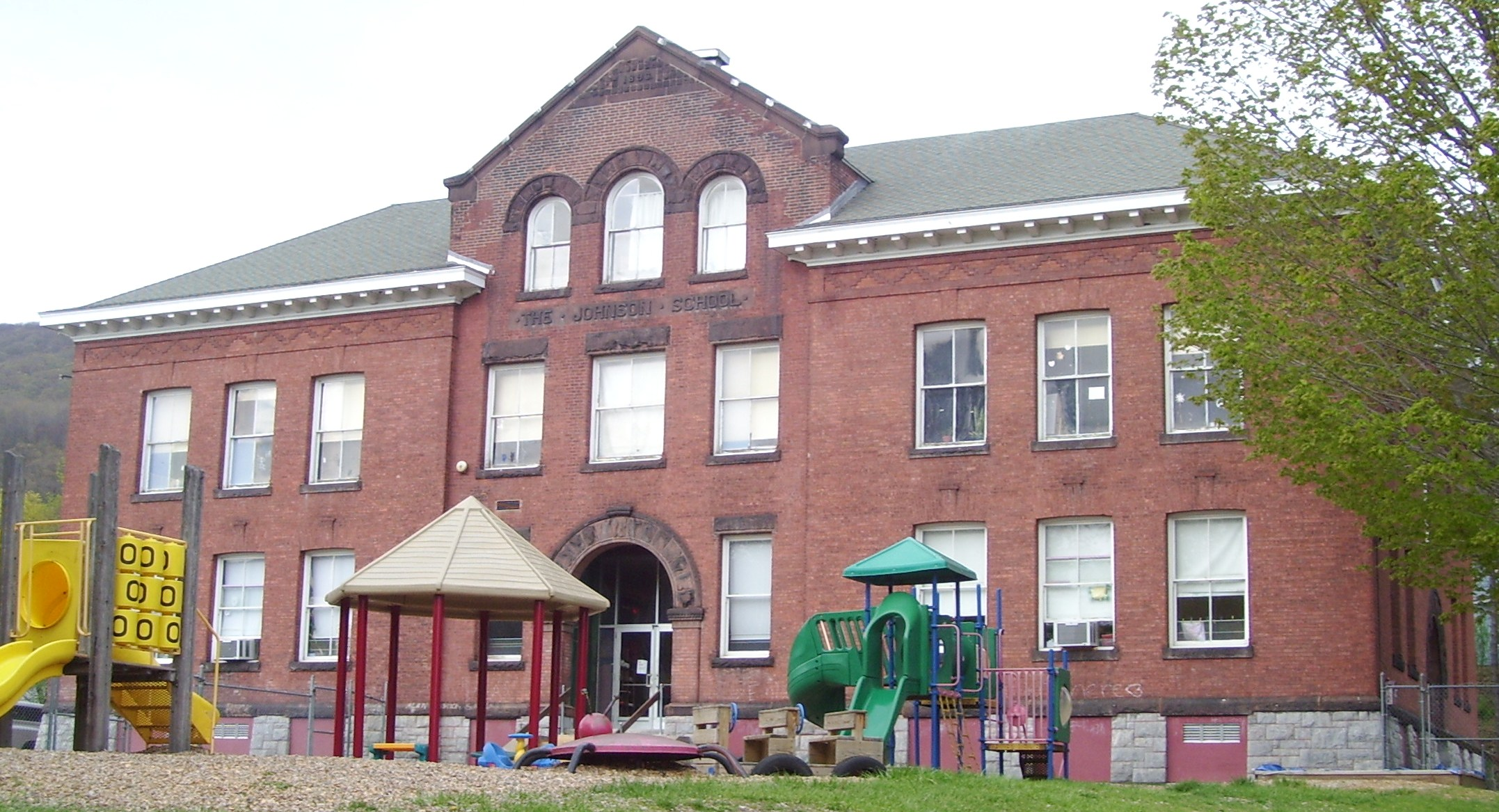
Johnson School

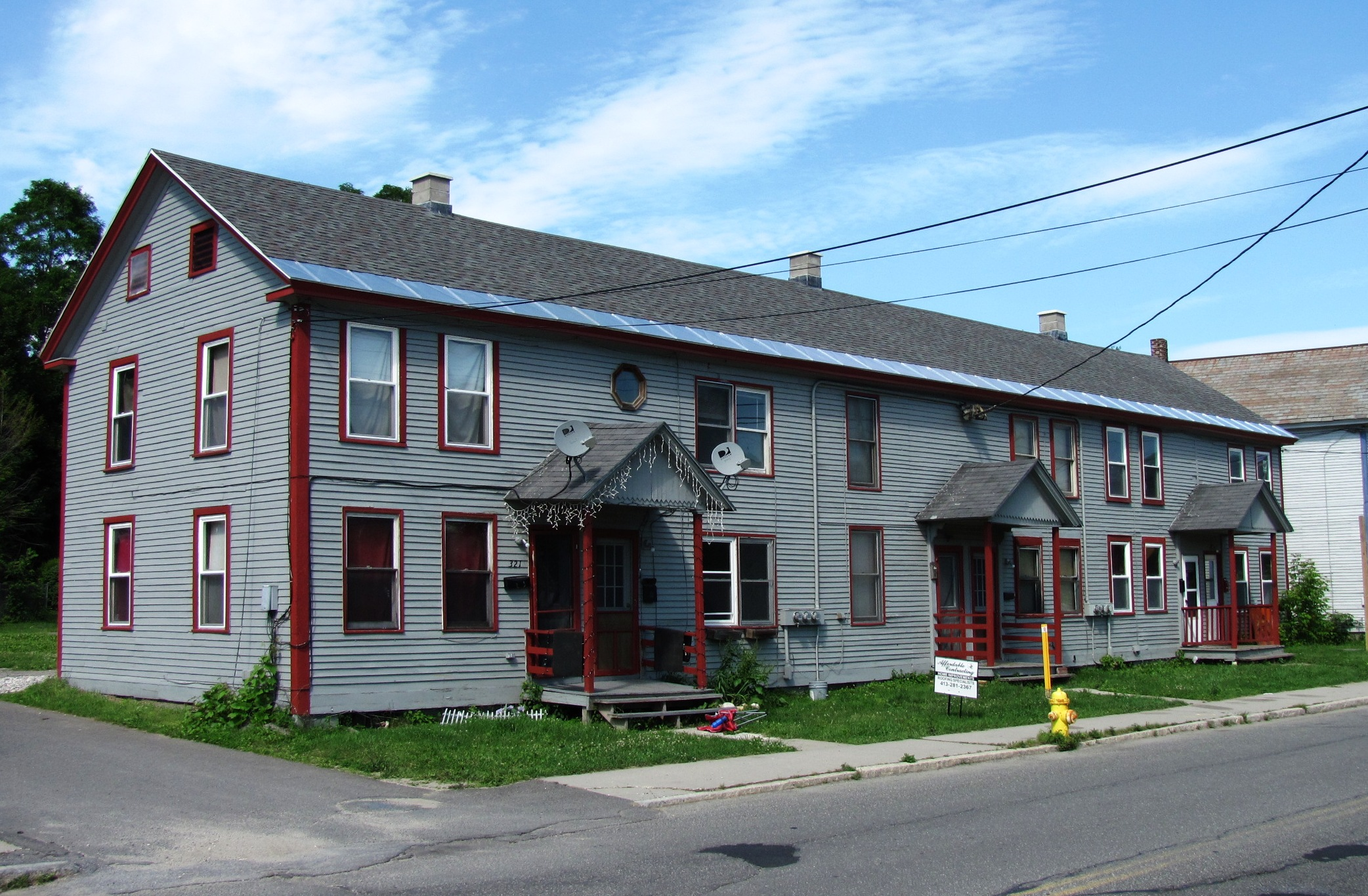
Hathaway Tenement was built in 1850

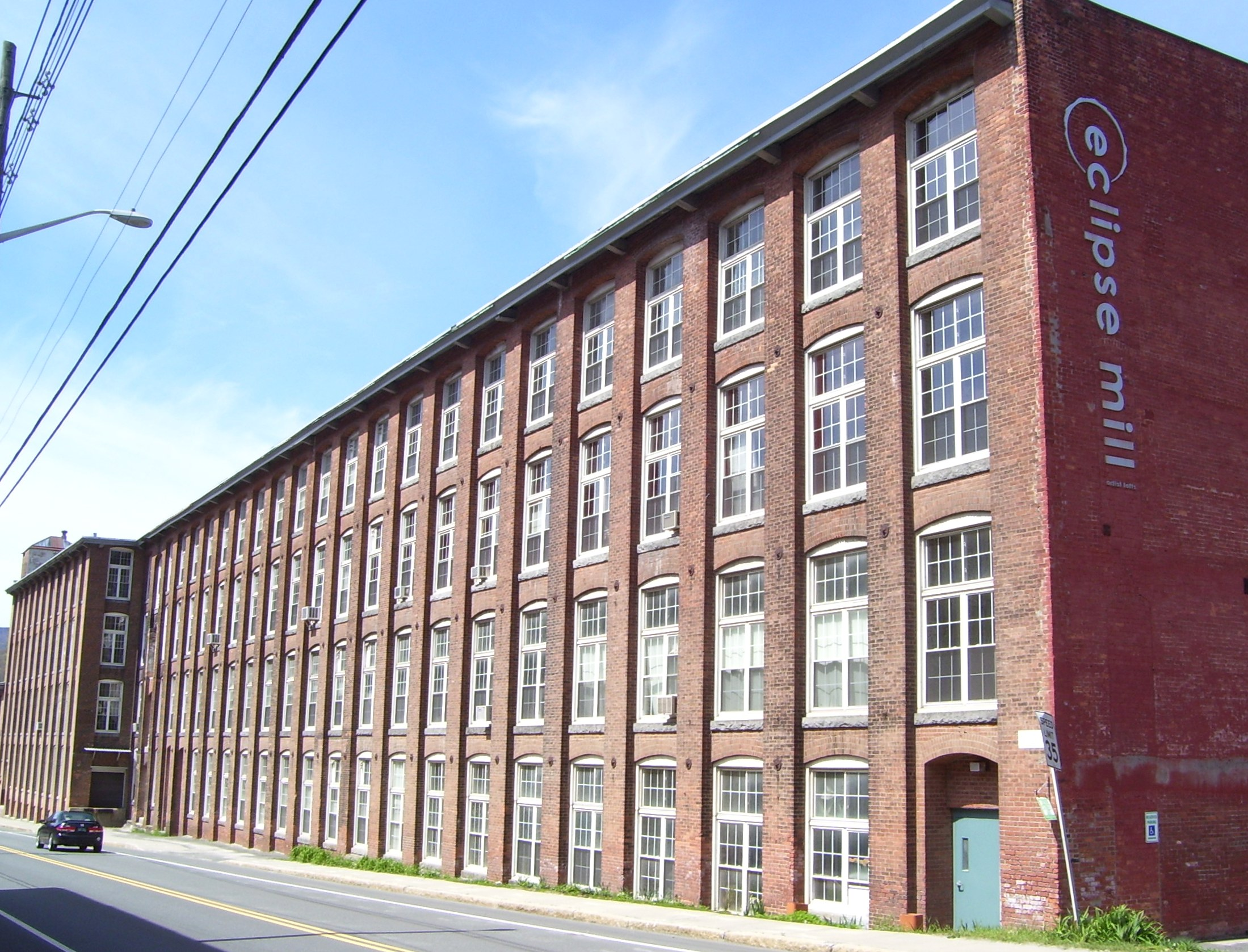
Eclipse Mill was converted into lofts for artists to live and work

=== Arts ===
Due to North Adams being the location of MASS MoCA, there are numerous art galleries spread throughout the city, and a few of the old mills have been converted to lofts for artists to live and work in. A new, Frank Gehry-designed Extreme Model Railroad and Contemporary Architecture Museum is proposed to be built in North Adams.

=== Sites and events ===
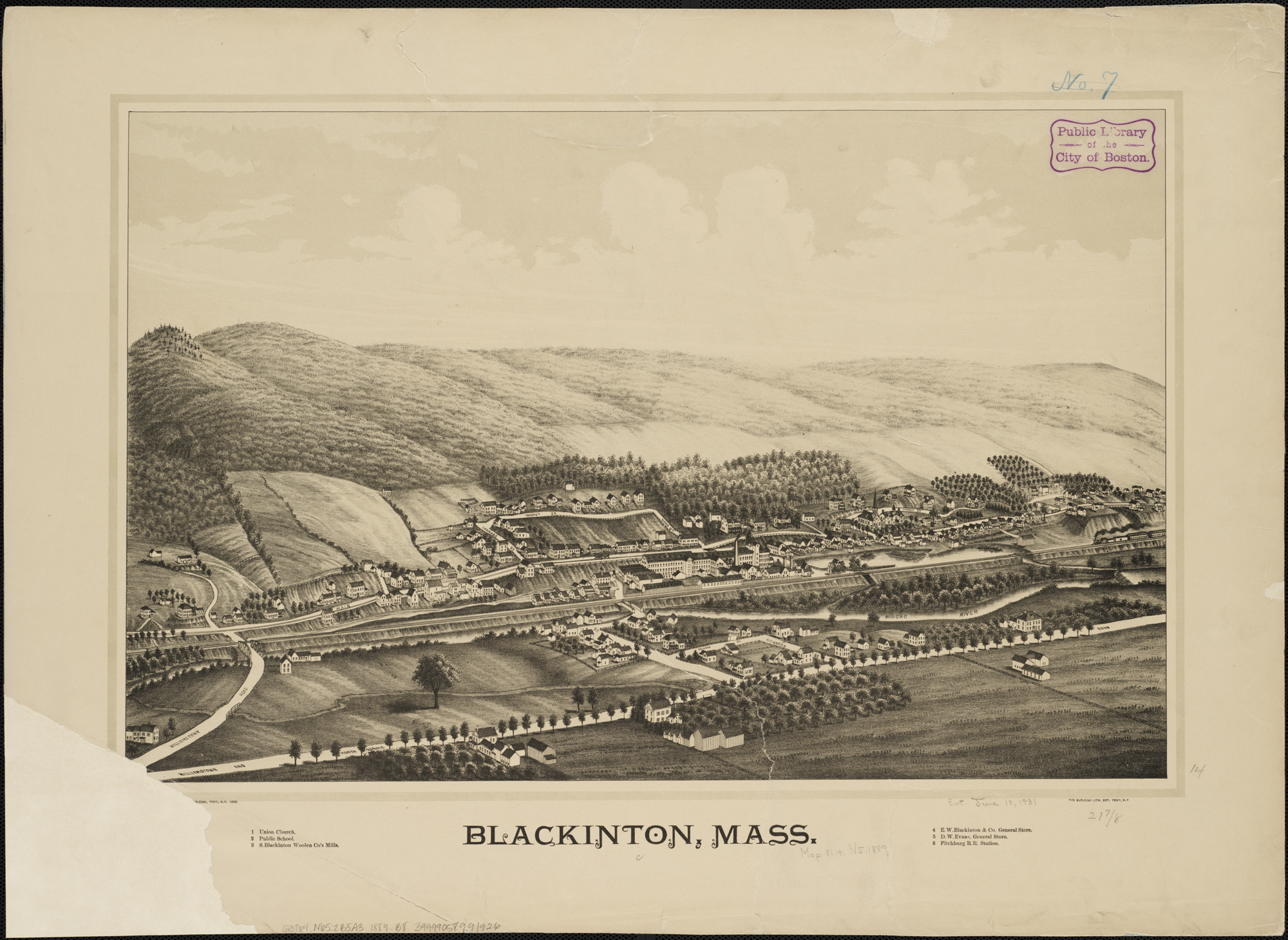
Lithograph of Blackinton from 1889 by L.R. Burleigh with list of landmarks

- Houghton Mansion
- Massachusetts College of Liberal Arts
- Massachusetts Museum of Contemporary Art
- Natural Bridge State Park
- North Adams Museum of History and Science—North Adams Historical Society
- Western Gateway Heritage State Park
- Fall Foliage Festival
- Solid Sound Festival

=== Sites listed on National Register of Historic Places ===
- Armstrong House
- Beaver Mill
- Blackinton Historic District
- The Boardman
- Charles Browne House
- Church Street-Caddy Hill Historic District
- H. W. Clark Biscuit Company
- Crowley House
- Freeman's Grove Historic District
- Freight Yard Historic District
- Hathaway Tenement
- Hillside Cemetery
- Hoosac Tunnel
- Johnson Manufacturing Company
- Johnson School
- Monument Square-Eagle Street Historic District
- Norad Mill
- Wells House
- Windsor Print Works

== Sports ==
The city is home to the North Adams SteepleCats of the New England Collegiate Baseball League (NECBL). The SteepleCats play at Joe Wolfe Field in North Adams. The SteepleCats hold the NECBL record for highest single-game attendance. The record was made on July 4, 2006, in a game against the Holyoke Giants in front of 6,714 fans. Holyoke won the game 3–2.

North Adams' first professional sports franchise was the Berkshire Battalion, an expansion team of the Federal Hockey League, which played a single season in 2014–2015. Troubled by an embezzlement charge against its coach and general manager, who had also been manager of the municipal skating ring, and fractious lease negotiations with the city, the team relocated after its single season to Dayton, Ohio.

There are many athletic complexes and recreational fields throughout the city, including the Noel Field Athletic Complex, just south of the downtown, and the recently constructed Alcombright Athletic Complex, in the city's west end.

== Government ==
North Adams is governed by the mayor-council form of government (list of mayors of North Adams, Massachusetts). The city has its own services, including police, fire and public works. The city's public library is the largest in northern Berkshire County and has access to the regional library networks.

On the state level, North Adams is represented in the Massachusetts House of Representatives by the First Berkshire district, which covers northern Berkshire County, and is represented by former mayor John Barrett III of North Adams (elected in a special election in November, 2017). In the Massachusetts Senate, the city is represented by Sen. Paul Mark (the Berkshire, Hampshire and Franklin district, which includes all of Berkshire County and western Hampshire and Franklin counties). North Adams is located in the Eighth Massachusetts Governor's Council district and is represented by city resident Tara Jacobs. The city is patrolled by the Fourth (Cheshire) Station of Barracks "B" of the Massachusetts State Police.

On the national level, North Adams is represented in the United States House of Representatives as part of Massachusetts's 1st congressional district, and is represented by Richard Neal of Springfield. Massachusetts is currently represented in the United States Senate by senior Senator Elizabeth Warren and junior Senator Ed Markey.

North Adams presidential election results
| Year | Democratic | Republican | Third parties | Total Votes | Margin |
|---|---|---|---|---|---|
| 2020 | 71.07% 4,216 | 26.97% 1,600 | 1.96% 116 | 5,932 | 44.10% |
| 2016 | 64.23% 3,730 | 27.04% 1,570 | 8.73% 507 | 5,807 | 37.20% |
| 2012 | 77.30% 4,465 | 19.94% 1,152 | 2.75% 159 | 5,776 | 57.36% |
| 2008 | 76.66% 4,519 | 20.41% 1,203 | 2.93% 173 | 5,895 | 56.25% |
| 2004 | 74.89% 4,452 | 24.26% 1,442 | 0.86% 51 | 5,945 | 50.63% |
| 2000 | 67.66% 3,714 | 25.34% 1,391 | 7.00% 384 | 5,489 | 42.32% |
| 1996 | 69.60% 3,910 | 17.60% 989 | 12.80% 719 | 5,618 | 51.99% |
| 1992 | 58.62% 3,733 | 19.72% 1,256 | 21.66% 1,379 | 6,368 | 36.97% |
| 1988 | 68.15% 4,355 | 31.08% 1,986 | 0.77% 49 | 6,390 | 37.07% |
| 1984 | 52.94% 3,613 | 46.53% 3,176 | 0.53% 36 | 6,825 | 6.40% |
| 1980 | 50.41% 3,836 | 34.45% 2,621 | 15.14% 1,152 | 7,609 | 15.97% |
| 1976 | 66.09% 5,248 | 32.35% 2,569 | 1.56% 124 | 7,941 | 33.74% |
| 1972 | 57.65% 4,715 | 41.75% 3,415 | 0.60% 49 | 8,179 | 15.89% |
| 1968 | 69.39% 5,958 | 27.98% 2,402 | 2.63% 226 | 8,586 | 41.42% |
| 1964 | 80.35% 7,304 | 19.42% 1,765 | 0.23% 21 | 9,090 | 60.94% |
| 1960 | 70.63% 6,883 | 29.26% 2,851 | 0.11% 11 | 9,745 | 41.38% |
| 1956 | 44.10% 4,425 | 55.73% 5,593 | 0.17% 17 | 10,035 | 11.64% |
| 1952 | 50.38% 5,502 | 49.48% 5,404 | 0.15% 16 | 10,922 | 0.90% |
| 1948 | 61.40% 6,269 | 37.86% 3,865 | 0.74% 76 | 10,210 | 23.55% |
| 1944 | 59.18% 5,613 | 40.69% 3,859 | 0.14% 13 | 9,485 | 18.49% |
| 1940 | 61.88% 6,486 | 37.64% 3,945 | 0.49% 51 | 10,482 | 24.24% |

Voter Registration and Party Enrollment as of November 8, 2016
| Party | Number of Voters | Percentage |
|---|---|---|
| Democratic | 3,097 | 33.76% |
| Republican | 635 | 6.92% |
| Unaffiliated | 5,307 | 57.87% |
| Libertarian | 92 | 1.00% |
| Total | 9,171 | 100% |

== Education ==
North Adams operates its own public school system, with two elementary schools (Brayton Elementary School and Colegrove Park Elementary School) and Drury High School, which also serves several neighboring towns. The city is also home to Charles H. McCann Technical High School, as well as several private and parochial schools.

=== Former schools ===
- Johnson School (Closed 1994, Grades Pre-K–5)
- Silvio O. Conte Middle School (Closed June 2009, Grades 6–8)
- Sullivan Elementary School (Closed December 2015, Grades K–7)
- St. Joseph's School (North Adams, Massachusetts) (Closed in 1970s)
- Notre Dame school. Closed 1975. Grades K–8.

=== Higher education ===
Massachusetts College of Liberal Arts (MCLA) enrolls about 900 students. Founded in 1894 as North Adams Normal School, in 1932, the Normal School became the State Teachers College of North Adams. In 1960, the college changed its name to North Adams State College and added professional degrees in Business Administration and Education. In 1997, the name changed to Massachusetts College of Liberal Arts, reflective of specialty school status within the Massachusetts State College system.

== Transportation ==
=== Roads and highways ===
North Adams is the western terminus of the Mohawk Trail, which ascends to the West Summit along a steep, curving road. While the trail ends here, Massachusetts Route 2, which the trail is coextensive with, continues westward into Williamstown and towards New York. Route 8 also passes through the city, passing from Adams through the city and northward into Clarksburg. Route 8A, also known as 8A-U (for "upper"), runs parallel to Route 8 east of the main route, and is located entirely within city limits.

The nearest interstate highway is Interstate 91 to the east, almost an hour away. North Adams appears on that highway's signs at Exit 26, located in Greenfield.

=== Bus ===
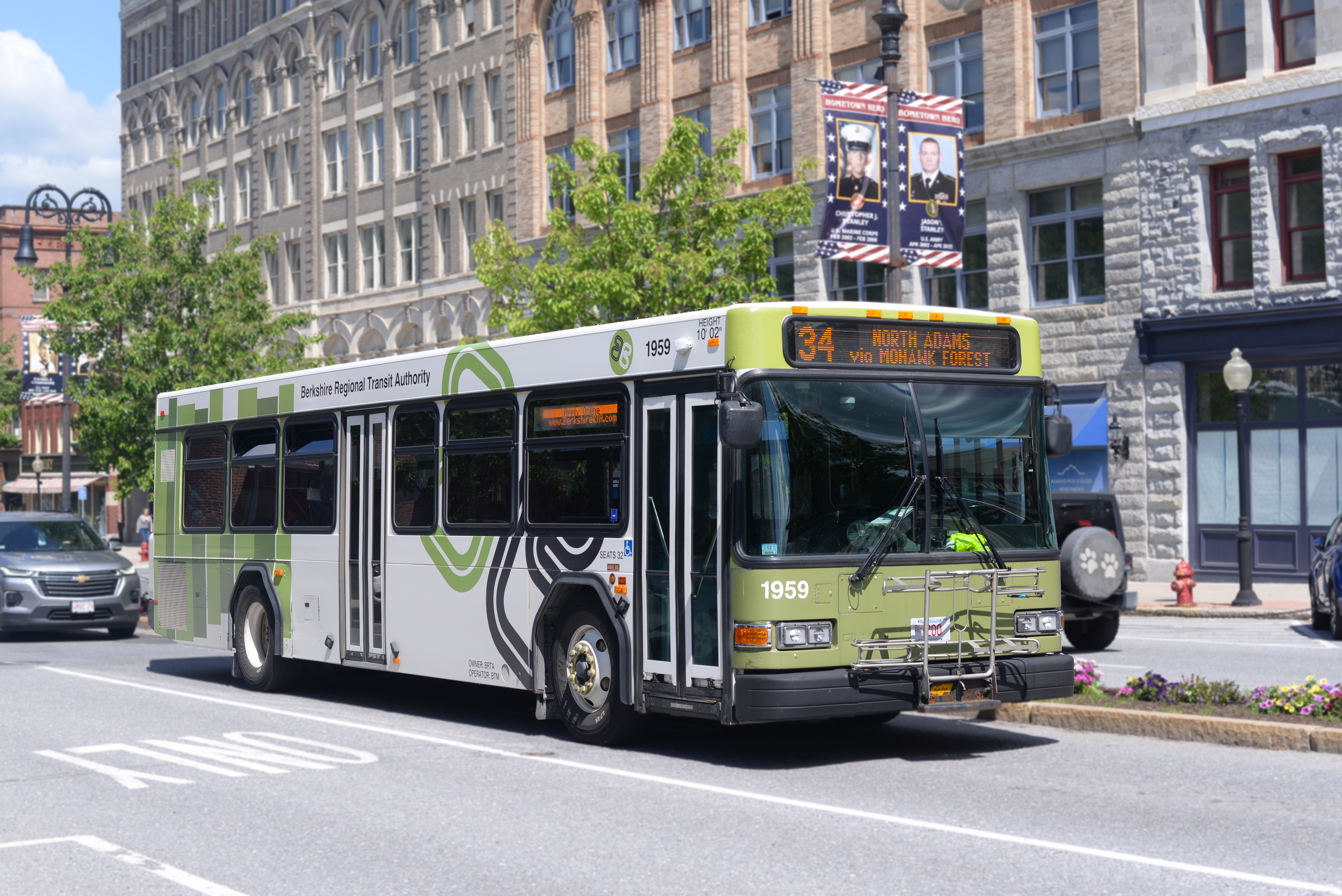
Route 34 of the BRTA along Main Street in North Adams

The city is the northern terminus of several lines of the Berkshire Regional Transit Authority (BRTA) and also has regional service. Intercity bus service is provided in nearby Williamstown by Peter Pan Lines with connections to New York City, as well as towns and cities between.

In January 2026 the three regional transit authorities in Western Mass launched Link413, a joint collaboration that offers customers three new longer-distance, weekday bus routes providing direct service across four counties and enabling out-of-state connections. With the launch of the Link413 service, new weekday bus routes were established between North Adams and Pittsfield as well as North Adams and Greenfield.

=== Rail ===
The nearest passenger rail service to North Adams is in Greenfield, Massachusetts and Pittsfield. The freight rail line which passes through the city extends through the Hoosac Tunnel towards the east.

There is a proposal known as Northern Tier Passenger Rail in the early stages of planning, which would extend Amtrak service from Boston North Station through Greenfield and terminate at North Adams.

=== Air ===
The nearest airport with national service is Albany International Airport. North Adams is home to Harriman-and-West Airport, a small regional airport.

== Notable people ==
- Amanda L. Aikens (1833–1892), Editor, philanthropist
- Caleb Atwater (1778–1867), Archeologist, politician
- Paul Babeau (born 1969), Sheriff, politician
- Andrea Barrett (born 1954), Novelist
- Jonah Bayliss (born 1980), MLB relief pitcher
- Daniel E. Bosley (born 1953), State representative
- Harry C. Browne (1878–1954), Banjo player and actor
- Gailanne Cariddi (1953–2017), State representatives
- Arthur P. Carpenter, US Marshal for Vermont
- Jack Chesbro (1874–1931), Hall of Fame pitcher
- Martha Coakley (born 1953), Massachusetts attorney general
- Jeremiah Colegrove (1758–1836), Early leading citizen
- John M. Darby (1804–1877), Botanist, chemist
- Will Durant (1885–1981), Philosopher, historian
- Paul Farmer (1959–2022), Physician, anthropologist
- Joseph F. Finnegan (1904–1964), Labor mediator
- Van Hansis (born 1981), Actor
- John Henry Haynes (1849–1910), Archaeologist and photographer
- Peter Laird (born 1954), Comic book artist
- Amy Lee, Saxophonist
- Frank J. Matrango (1926–1996), Massachusetts state legislator
- Martin Melcher (1915–1968), Film producer and husband of Doris Day
- Francis Millard (1914–1958), U.S. Olympic Silver Medalist Wrestler
- Thomas Ward Osborn (1833–1898), U.S. Senator, Col. in Civil War
- Harrison Potter (1891–1984), Classical pianist
- Fritz Redl (1902–1988), Child psychoanalyst and educator
- Robert Rheinlander (1880–1961), Architect and civil engineer
- William E. Roberts (1926–2025), member of the New Hampshire House of Representatives
- John Henry Schwarz, Theoretical physicist
- Hiram Sibley (1807–1888), Industrialist, philanthropist
- Frank J. Sprague (1857–1934), Electrical engineer, inventor
- John St. Cyr (1936–2022), Massachusetts state legislator and judge
- Jane Swift (born 1965), Massachusetts Lt. governor
- Oswald Tower (1883–1968), Basketball official
- Frank Vincent (1939–2017), Actor
- James H. Dargie (1970–), Art/Creative Director
- Ashley B. Wright (1841–1897), U.S. representative

== Sister city ==
- Tremosine sul Garda, Italy

== See also ==
- List of mill towns in Massachusetts
