= Natural Bridge State Park (Massachusetts) =

State park in Massachusetts, United States

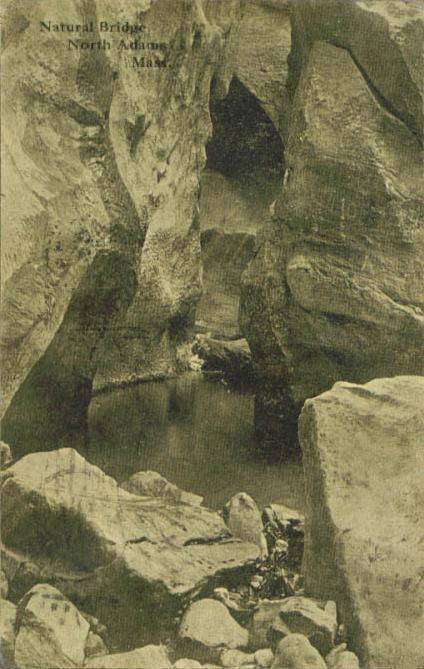

- Location within Massachusetts Location within the United States
- Location: North Adams, Massachusetts, United States
- Coordinates: 42°42′27″N 73°05′34″W
- Area: 44 acres (18 ha)
- Elevation: 978 ft (298 m)
- Established: 1985
- Administrator: Massachusetts Department of Conservation and Recreation
- Website: Official website

Natural Bridge State Park is a Massachusetts state park located in the city of North Adams in the northwestern part of the state. Named for its natural bridge of white marble, unique in North America, the park also offers woodland walks with views of a dam made of white marble, and a picturesque old marble quarry.

== History ==
The bedrock marble from which the natural bridge was created is estimated to be some 550 million years old. Water from glacial runoff began carving the arch after the last ice age, 13,000 years ago.

The site of a marble quarry from 1810 to 1947 and a privately owned tourist attraction from 1950 to 1983, the site became a state park in 1985. The arch and associated quarry have long attracted attention from hikers, including author Nathaniel Hawthorne who visited in 1838.

== Hudson Brook ==
The Mohawk Indians that lived, hunted, and fished in the area possibly saw no gain in naming the small brook, but when an explorer for the Massachusetts fort stumbled upon the many caves and rock formations he took it upon himself to aptly name Hudson Brook; forever paying homage to himself. Lieutenant Seth Hudson was stationed at Fort Massachusetts in 1759 and discovered what is today known as Hudson Brook around 1760 when he relocated out to the Western Massachusetts/Vermont border. Hudson was later one of the founders of the southern Vermont town of Pownal.

Hudson Brook is responsible for many of the marble formations that can be seen at the Natural Bridge. The brook cascades down a marble maze and eventually makes its way through a cave known as Hudson Cave. This natural wonder was one of several locations in the Berkshires noted in the journal of Nathaniel Hawthorne which was eventually published under the title The American Note-books.

== The mills ==
The Natural Bridge site is rich in a multitude of minerals, including calcite, muscovite, feldspar, pyrite, and quartz---but it is mostly known for its rich deposits of marble rock. This quarry brought great wealth to the community. North Adams saw a boom in its economy and culture for well over one hundred years because of the mill located there, while marble cutting brought a wealth of aesthetic greatness.

Stone cutting in North Adams started at first in an inexperienced, coarse manner. Amateur workers cut marble for gravestones, stone facings, underpinnings, and mantle pieces for the wealthier class in town. The earliest stone cutting was unorganized and generally unregulated until around 1810.

In 1810, Solomon Sherman who was a man of “high reputation” commenced his business at the natural bridge site. His operation was based on home trade. Operations were continued and taken over by his heir, Manson Sherman. It was in 1830 that Elijah Pike decided to start his own operation, opening up a shop on Eagle Street.

In 1830, Elijah Pike opened up his shop on the main strip of town. As the quality and quantity of the marble became known, a wider market opened up and Pike saw a chance to commence his operation with capital from one Dr. E.S. Hawkes. The men pooled their resources in improving the grounds, laying out a road, and putting up the mills. All of this was at a cost of 1,800 dollars. In 1837, Mr. Blackinton, a local man, bought in with Mr. Pike and the operation continued until it was sold to W.M. McAuley for 7,000 dollars in 1838. From this point on, it was owned by a joint stock company and the annual product (marble, lime, etc.) was estimated at 56,000, which was quite a nice amount of cash.

Preservation efforts started early when in 1835 two gentleman known as Messrs. Dwight and Denny bought the marble ledge for 150 dollars for the purposes of preserving the area. Five acres of surrounding land was purchased by one John Page for 217 dollars, whom entered into a perpetual lease from the town, who then owned thirty acres of land.
