= Charles Browne House =

Historic house in Massachusetts, United States

- U.S. National Register of Historic Places
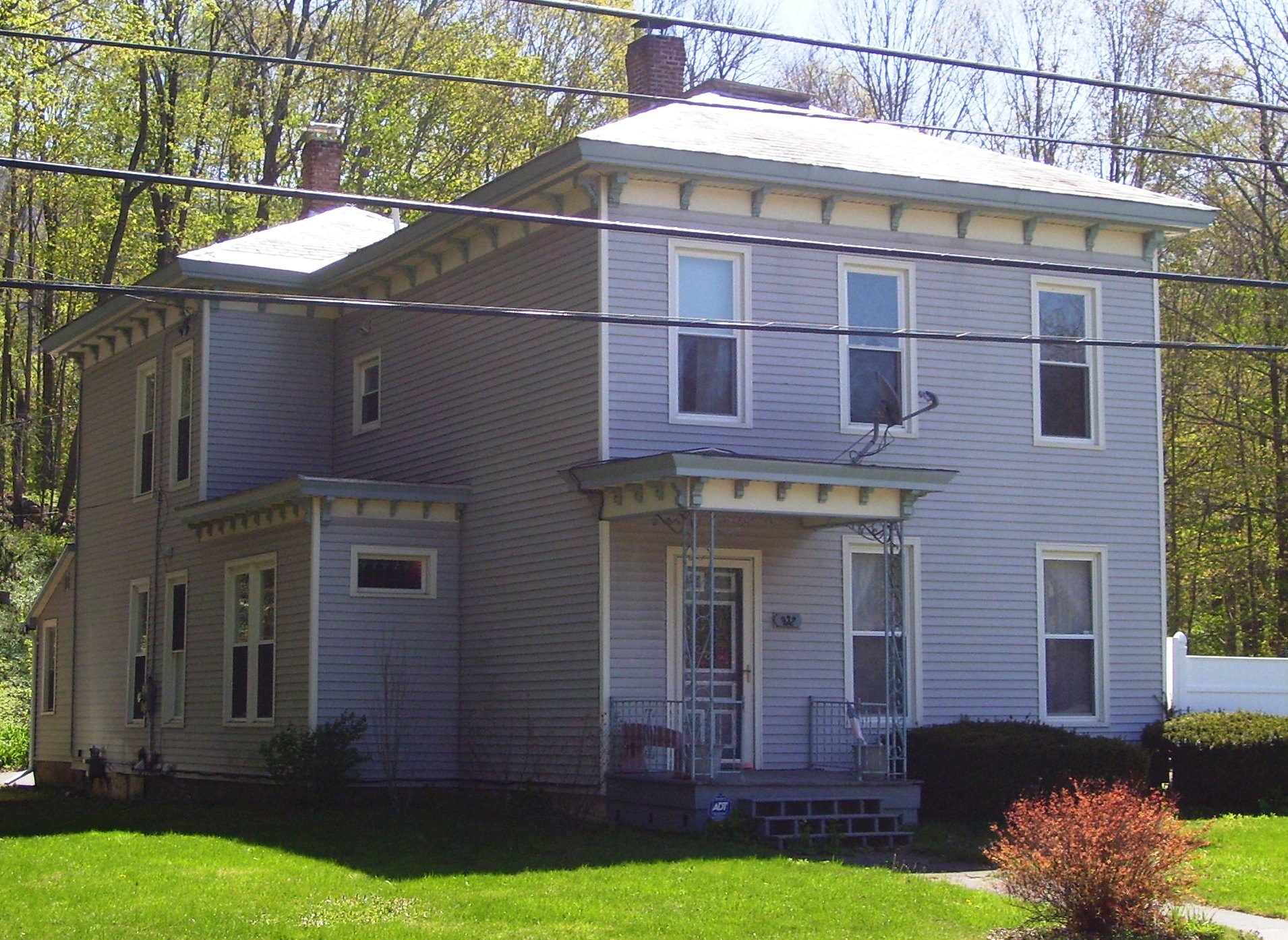
- (2012)

- Location within Massachusetts Location within the United States
- Location: 932 S. Church St., North Adams, Massachusetts
- Coordinates: 42°40′43″N 73°5′52″W
- Area: 2.3 acres (0.93 ha)
- Built: 1869
- Architectural style: Italianate
- MPS: North Adams MRA
- NRHP reference No.: 85003413
- Added to NRHP: October 25, 1985

The Charles Browne House is a historic house located in North Adams, Massachusetts. Built in 1869, it was the home of Charles A. Browne Sr., inventor of the electrical fuse and an innovator of devices and materials used in construction of the nearby Hoosac Tunnel. The house is a well-preserved example of a local variant of Italianate architecture, and was listed on the National Register of Historic Places in 1985.

== Description and history ==
The Charles Browne House is located southeast of downtown North Adams, on the east side of South Church Street (Massachusetts Route 8A), a short way north of Southview Cemetery and also a short way west of the western portal of the Hoosac Tunnel. It is a two-story wood-frame structure, roughly cubic in shape, with a low-pitch hip roof and clapboarded exterior. The main facade is three bays wide, with the entrance in the left bay, sheltered by a hip-roofed portico supported by decorative metalwork. Both the porch and main roof have extended eaves supported by decorative brackets. A single-story polygonal window bay projects from the right side, and a two-story addition extends to the rear.

The house was built in 1869 for Charles Albert Browne Sr., a local inventor who is credited with a number of innovations while working for companies providing explosives to the builders of the tunnel. Most significant of these was the development of an electrical fuse that would work reliably in the tunnel's damp conditions. His house exhibits a number of characteristic signatures of a distinctive regional variant of the Italianate style: the side entrance on the front facade, the window bay, and the bracketed eaves. Browne and his brother established a small factory across the street, which survives in significantly altered form.

== See also ==
- National Register of Historic Places listings in Berkshire County, Massachusetts
