= Extreme Model Railroad and Contemporary Architecture Museum =

Proposed museum showcasing model railroads and contemporary architecture

Coordinates: 42.6974°N 73.1142°W

The Extreme Model Railroad and Contemporary Architecture Museum was a museum proposed for North Adams, Massachusetts that plans to display model trains running through a landscape of notable modern architecture. Architect Frank Gehry has contracted to design the new museum, which will be located a few blocks away from the MASS MoCA modern art museum. Thomas Krens, former director of the Guggenheim Museum who oversaw the creation of the Gehry-designed Guggenheim Museum Bilbao and Guggenheim Abu Dhabi, and a Mass MoCA founder, is heading the creation of the new museum.

The plan calls for an 83,000-square-foot museum to be built at an estimated cost to $65 million, featuring model trains running continuously past scale-models of buildings by notable architects including Louis Sullivan, Frank Lloyd Wright, and Frank Gehry. It will be built on publicly owned land overlooking a disused rail freight yard; the proposed Museum holds an option to purchase the land. About half of the financing is projected to come from state and local government funds allocated to support the growth of tourism, and half from private donations of which $2.5 million had been raised by August 2017.

As of 2017 the projected opening date was 2020, but as of February 2022 the new projected opening date is 2025. As of January 2023 the project did not have a start date or funding finalized.
