= Windsor Print Works =

- U.S. National Register of Historic Places
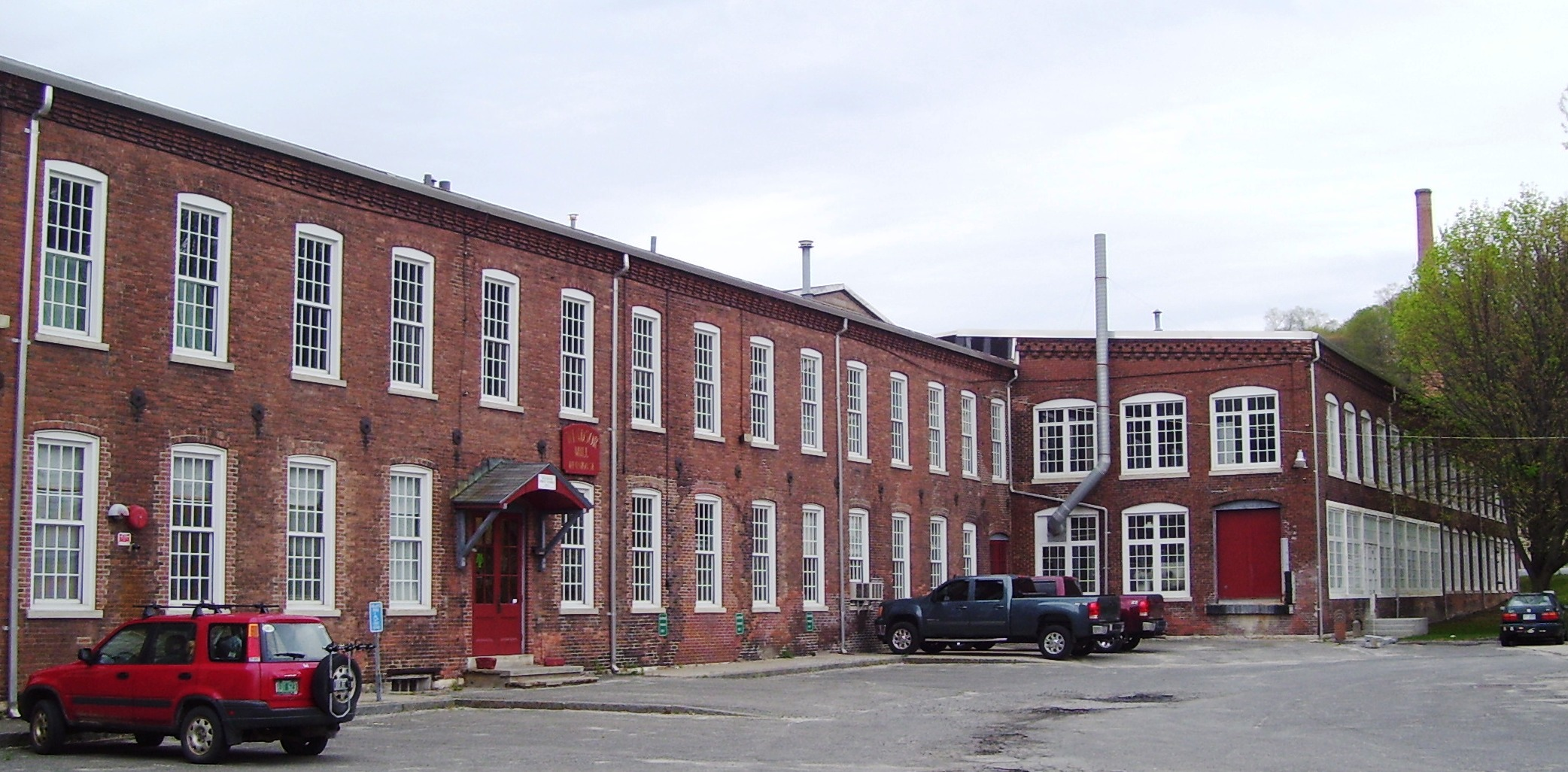
- Windsor Print Works

- Location within Massachusetts Location within the United States
- Location: 121 Union St., North Adams, Massachusetts
- Coordinates: 42°42′2″N 73°6′18″W
- Area: 9 acres (3.6 ha)
- Built: 1872
- NRHP reference No.: 73000296
- Added to NRHP: May 17, 1973

Windsor Print Works is a historic textile mill at 121 Union Street in North Adams, Massachusetts. Founded in 1829, with buildings dating to 1872, it was one of the first textile mills in western Massachusetts, and the first place in the United States to create printed cotton fabric. It was listed on the National Register of Historic Places in 1973. The property now houses a variety of arts-related and light manufacturing businesses.

== Description and history ==
The Windsor Print Works is located east of downtown North Adams, on the north side of Massachusetts Route 2 between Canal and Cliff Streets, on the northern side of the Hoosic River. The property is 9 acres (3.6 ha) in size, with twelve interconnected buildings. All are of brick construction, and range in height from two to four stories. All were built between 1872 and 1889. The site's industrial history dates to the 1820s, with power originally provided by water delivered through a canal from the river.

Founded by Caleb Turner in 1829, the Windsor Print Works was the first in Western Massachusetts. The plant was taken over by the Consolidated Textile Company during the 1920s, until the company closed in 1956 due to foreign competition. In 1960 the main building was purchased by Stanley Shapiro, and was used mostly for storage. When the Economic Development Corporation of North Berkshire took it over in 1973, it was converted into a center for arts and crafts. North Adams took the building over in the 1980s. Currently, the Windsor Print Works is used for light manufacturing and arts-related businesses, including galleries.

== See also ==
- National Register of Historic Places listings in Berkshire County, Massachusetts
