= Braytonville =

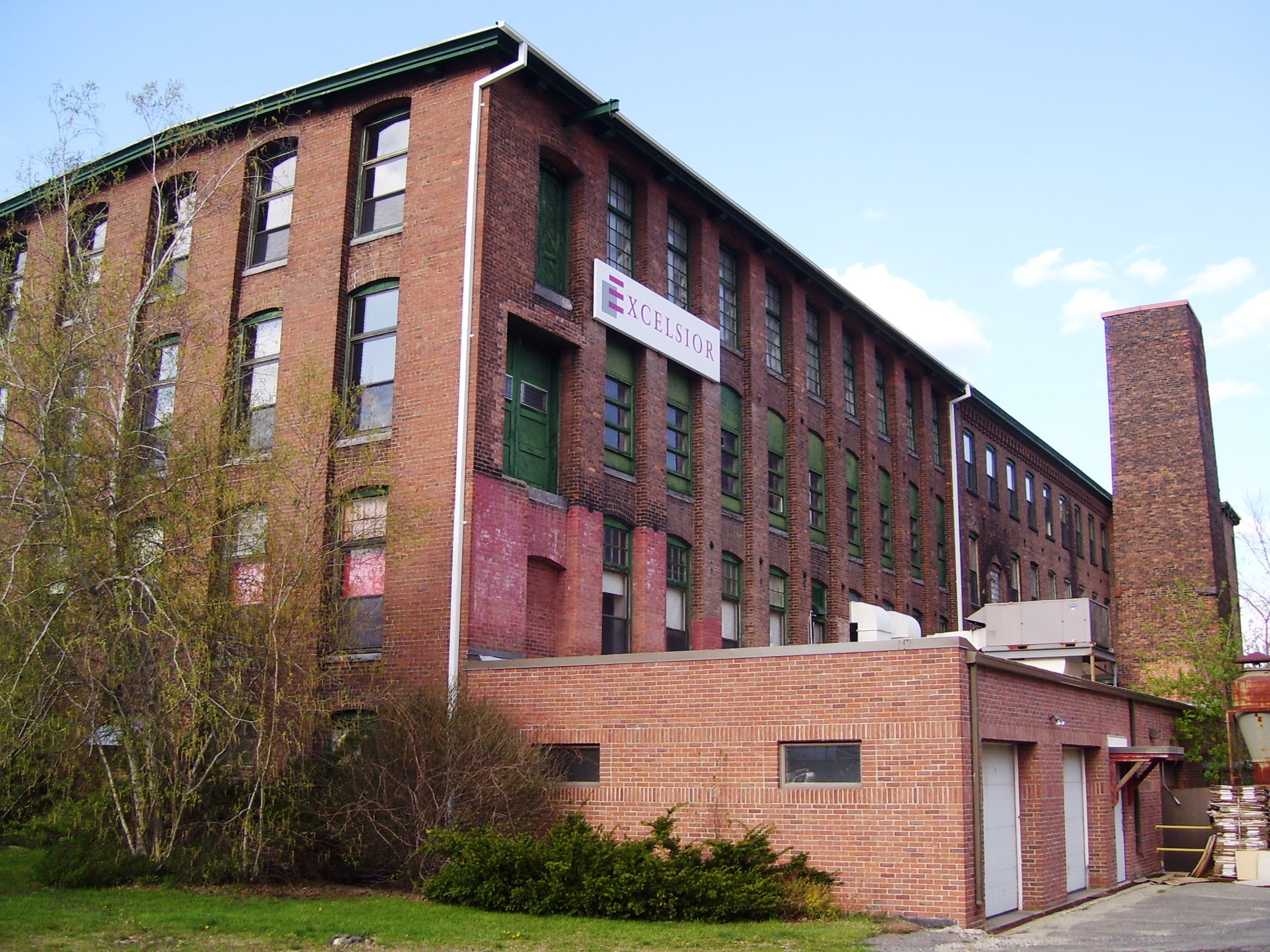
The Norad Mill

In 1831 the land, owned by Luke Brown, had been purchased for $520 by William E. and Thomas A. Brayton. In 1832 a stone mill 40 x 74 feet, three stories high, with an attic was constructed allowing for larger print cloths, 52 by 52 feet to be manufactured on twenty looms under the name of T.A. Brayton & Co.. The factory village that grew around the mill became known as Braytonville. Sanford Blackinton, one of North Adams' leading mill owners, and Daniel Dewey, the prime mover in forming the North Adams Woolen Company, constructed the replacement Norad Mill in 1863. The village was briefly named Deweyville, after Daniel Dewey, in 1863 until his retirement in 1868.

The village was bounded immediately to the south by Wells House, a historic house at 568 West Main Street built around 1840 by Orson Wells, who first settled in North Adams in the 1810s and established an acid production facility nearby. To the east, the area also includes Sykes House built in 1890 at 521 West Main Street. To the west is the location of Fort Massachusetts, which was the westernmost fort built by British colonists in Massachusetts. The original village included Alton Place, Avon and West Main Streets on which 17 homes were demolished in 1996 due to the vaporizing of a toxic trichloroethylene (TCE) plume of groundwater seeping west from the Brown Street site of the Sprague Electric plant.
