= NORAD (board game) =

1973 Cold War board wargame

- Cover of rulebook
- Designers: Dana Lombardy; Harry M. Mishler; Greg Thill
- Publishers: Simulations Design Corporation; Mishler Co.
- Publication: 1973 (SDC); 1977 (Mishler)
- Genres: Cold War

NORAD, subtitled "Strategic Games of Air Warfare", is a board game originally published by Simulations Design Corporation (SDC) in 1973 that simulates a hypothetical attack on the United States by the USSR. A revised edition was published by Mishler Company in 1977.

== Description ==
NORAD (North American Aerospace Defense Command) is a 2-player game set in the mid-1970s Cold War in which one player controls a Soviet Union bomber fleet and the other player controls American defenses. The map covers North America from the North Pole to the southern American border. Thirty American cities are marked with values from 5 (Dallas) to 9 (New York and Chicago). The Soviet player has 23 bomber counters and 7 decoy bombers. The American player has a 12 fighters, 5 missiles, and 5 decoy missiles. The fighters have a range of 6 hexes and the missiles have a range of zero.

=== Gameplay ===
The American player positions fighters, missiles and decoys on the map. The Russian player launches a bomber attack at the northern edge of the map. The American player waits until a bomber or missile is within range, and then interdicts with either a fighter or missile. When an interaction occurs, both players flip over their counter to reveal whether the counter is real or a decoy. If the fighter or missile is a decoy, the decoy is removed from play and the bomber continues on. If the fighter or missile is real, then both fighter or missile and the bomber are both removed from play.

If a bomber reaches a city unscathed, it is flipped over. If the reverse is blank, it is a decoy and is removed from play. If a mushroom cloud is revealed, the attack was successful. The mushroom cloud is left in place, and the Soviet player gains that city's score.

With a simple one-to-one elimination system that uses no dice, the game has been characterized as "low complexity".

=== Victory conditions ===
The Soviet player wins by scoring 30 points or more. The American player wins by preventing this.

=== Variants ===
A number of variants are included in the rules:

- "Solitaire": A solitaire variant where the Russian bombers move on a programmed basis and the player controls the defenses.
- "DEW Line": If the Russian player takes out Anchorage and Godthåb, the anchors of the DEW Line, then Russian bombers enter the map on the 8th row from the top of the map rather than the first row.
- "Cuba Base": Up to five bombers (two of which must be decoys) can enter the game on the southern edge of the map from a hypothetical base in Cuba.
- "SLBM": The Russian player can replace up to five bombers with the same number of submarine-launched cruise missiles. These are launched adjacent to American coastal cities. The American player has one turn to destroy them before they detonate.
- "Canadian Air Defense": The American player places four Canadian fighters, one Canadian missile and one decoy on Canadian cities. All Canadian cities now become legitimate targets for Russian bombers.

== Publication history ==
NORAD was designed by Dana Lombardy and appeared as a free pull-out game in Issue 4 of SDC's wargaming magazine Conflict in 1973. SDC also released it as a ziplock bag game. Designer Lombardy called it "a level 1 game. That is, a simple simulation: a platform on which to build more complicated models."

The game failed to find an audience, and in a 1976 poll conducted by Simulations Publications Inc. to determine the most popular board wargames in North America, it placed only 192nd out of 202 games.

After SDC went out of business, the game rights were acquired by Mishler Company. Harry M. Mishler and Greg Thill revised the rules, making changes to counterbalance and the Solitaire variant. They also added rules to allow the American player to hide fighter placement and prevent the Russian player from endlessly flying back and forth across the map. The new edition was published by Mishler in 1977.

== Reception ==
In Issue 60 of Panzerfaust, Ty Bomba commented, "Of course, in a strict sense, it's impossible for a game dealing with a campaign that never happened, to be historically accurate, but NORAD is accurate in that it gives you a 'feel' of what it must be like to be in the 'war room' beneath the Pentagon, the White House, or wherever it may be buried ... it plays very well, is tense, fast, great fun."

In his 1977 book The Comprehensive Guide to Board Wargaming, Nicky Palmer liked the "handsome map", but mourned the loss of the game as SDC went out of business as his review was being published.

In Issue 89 of Campaign, Don Lowry noted "It is, of course, not a detailed 'realistic' simulation. It is a simple, playable game. As such, it is a near-classic."

In Issue 32 of The Space Gamer (October 1980), Steve Jackson wrote "Recommended (mostly for components) if you like the subject and want to develop your own variants. Otherwise, nothing more than an introductory game for the young or inexperienced."

In a retrospective review in Issue 15 of Simulacrum, Brian Train called this "a simple game of bluff and counter-bluff ... Play is not particularly subtle except in the deployment of decoys." Train concluded, "Adding more NORAD decoys and deploying fighters face down might increase the unpredictability and tension."
