= Norad Mill =

- U.S. National Register of Historic Places
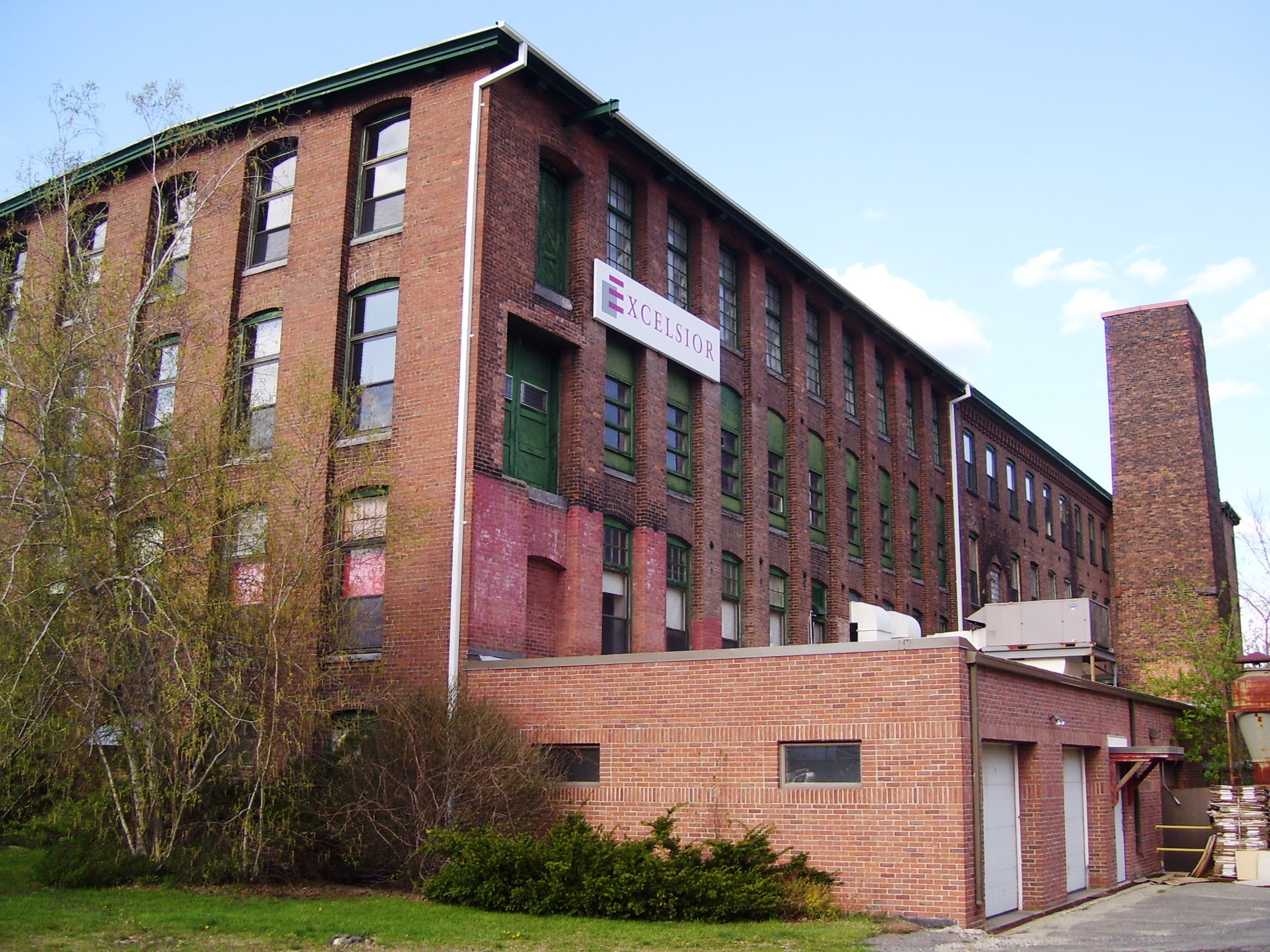
- (2012)

- Location within Massachusetts Location within the United States
- Location: 60 Roberts Dr., North Adams, Massachusetts
- Coordinates: 42°41′55″N 73°8′20″W
- Area: 4.5 acres (1.8 ha)
- Built: 1863
- Architectural style: Italianate
- MPS: North Adams MRA
- NRHP reference No.: 85003417
- Added to NRHP: October 25, 1985

The Norad Mill is a historic mill located in Braytonville, North Adams, Massachusetts. It is the oldest mill complex in North Adams that has not had its exterior significantly altered, making visible much of its Italianate styling.

In 1831 the land, owned by Luke Brown, had been purchased for $520 by William E. and Thomas A. Brayton, and in 1832 a stone mill 40 x 74 feet, three stories high, with an attic was constructed. Larger print cloths, 52 by 52 feet were manufactured on twenty looms under the name of T.A. Brayton & Co.. The factory village, known as Braytonville, grew around the new mill and was briefly named Deweyville, after Daniel Dewey, in 1863 and until his retirement in 1868.

The Norad Mill was built in 1863 by Sanford Blackinton, one of North Adams' leading mill owners, and Daniel Dewey, the prime mover in forming the North Adams Woolen Company. Blackinton used the mill to produce woolen goods that were in high demand during the American Civil War. The business was reorganized as the North Adams Manufacturing Company in 1878, with H.G.B.Fisher taking over as President and E.B. Penniman as Treasurer and Agent. At that time the works had fifty looms, employing 275 hands and turned out 20,000 yards of six-quarter fancy cassimeres per month.

The mill continued to be the site of woolen textile production, under a variety of corporate names, until 1947. In 1954 the Excelsior Printing Company began operations in the facility; it was acquired by Crane & Co., which (as of the 1985 National Register nomination), continued to operate that business under its original name. In 2005 the business and mill complex were purchased by Crane family member David Crane. In 2016 the printing business was sold to Integrity Graphics which has consolidated operations elsewhere. The mill complex includes, in addition to the main mill building, several 19th-century extensions and a storehouse erected in 1904. The complex was listed on the National Register of Historic Places in 1985.

The mill is located one mile west of downtown North Adams, on the north bank of the Hoosic River at the northeast corner of Roberts Drive and the Mohawk Trail (Massachusetts Route 2). The main mill building is a three-story brick structure, to which a number of smaller additions have been made. The largest scale addition to the building was an 1898 enlargement of the main structure, which maintained the roofline of the original 1863 building, while using more modern curtain wall construction methods.

The building has been purchased and partly renovated by commercial landlord Moresi and Associates. New tenants as of 2018 include a yarn company, a wine tasting room and a coffee roastery.

== See also ==
- National Register of Historic Places listings in Berkshire County, Massachusetts
