= List of properties managed by The Trustees of Reservations =

The following is a list of properties managed by The Trustees of Reservations (TTOR), a non-profit land conservation and historic preservation organization dedicated to preserving natural and historical places in the Commonwealth of Massachusetts. The Trustees are the oldest regional land trust in the world. The Trustees of Reservations own title to over 100 properties on 25,000 acres (10,000 ha) in Massachusetts, all of which are open to the public; it maintains conservation restrictions on 200 more properties. Properties include historic mansions, estates, and gardens; woodland preserves; waterfalls; mountain peaks; wetlands and riverways; coastal bluffs, beaches, and barrier islands; farmland and CSA projects; and archaeological sites.

Name	Town	County	Year Acquired	Acreage	Description
Governor Oliver Ames Estate	Easton; 42.0703°N 71.1020°W	Bristol	2012	36 acres (15 ha)	First home to Governor Oliver Ames
Appleton Farms	Hamilton / Ipswich; 42.6565°N 70.8450°W	Essex	1998	658 acres (266 ha)	One of the oldest working farms in the United States
Appleton Farms Grass Rides	Hamilton; 42.6565°N 70.8450°W	Essex	1970	259 acres (105 ha)	
Armstrong-Kelley Park	Osterville; 41.62867°N 70.38051°W	Barnstable	2021	8.5 acres (3.4 ha)	
Ashintully Gardens	Tyringham; 42.2159°N 70.3804°W	Berkshire	1996	120 acres (49 ha)	
Ashley House	Sheffield; 42.0594°N 73.3551°W	Berkshire	1972	1 acre (0.40 ha)	
Bartholomew's Cobble	Sheffield; 42.0575°N 73.3508°W	Berkshire	1946	329 acres (133 ha)	
Bear Swamp	Ashfield; 42.5491°N 72.8253°W	Franklin	1968	285 acres (115 ha)	
Bear's Den	New Salem; 42.5415°N 72.3251°W	Franklin	1968	6 acres (2.4 ha)	
Becket Historic Quarry & Forest	Becket; 42.25142°N 73.02011°W	Berkshire	2021	280 acres (110 ha)	
Francis William Bird Park	Walpole; 42.1597°N 71.2150°W	Norfolk	2003	89 acres (36 ha)	
Eleanor Cabot Bradley Estate	Canton; 42.2116°N 71.1198°W	Norfolk	1991	90 acres (36 ha)	
The Brickyard	Chilmark; 41.3772°N 70.744268°W	Dukes	2014	20 acres (8.1 ha)	
Bridge Island Meadows	Millis; 42.192°N 71.346°W	Norfolk	1974	80 acres (32 ha)	
Brooks Woodland Preserve	Petersham; 42.4738°N 72.1589°W	Worcester	1975	558 acres (226 ha)	
William Cullen Bryant Homestead	Cummington; 42.4713°N 72.9406°W	Hampshire	1927	195 acres (79 ha)	
Bullitt Reservation	Ashfield; 42.50226°N 72.75590°W	Franklin	2010	265 acres (107 ha)	
Cape Poge Wildlife Refuge	Edgartown; 41.4188°N 70.4518°W	Dukes	1959	516 acres (209 ha)	
Castle Hill	Ipswich; 42.6851°N 70.7792°W	Essex	1949	165 acres (67 ha)	
Cedariver	Millis; 42.1576°N 71.3351°W	Norfolk	2004	55 acres (22 ha)	
Chapel Brook	Ashfield; 42.4825°N 72.76°W	Franklin	1964	173 acres (70 ha)	
Charles River Peninsula	Needham; 42.2564°N 71.2667°W	Norfolk	1960	30 acres (12 ha)	
Chase Woodlands	Dover; 42.2339°N 71.3228°W	Norfolk	1993	85 acres (34 ha)	
Chesterfield Gorge	Chesterfield; 42.3931°N 72.88°W	Hampshire	1929	166 acres (67 ha)	
Chestnut Hill Farm	Southborough; 42.313094°N 71.55708°W	Worcester	2010	170 acres (69 ha)	
Coolidge Reservation	Manchester-by-the-Sea; 42.5742°N 70.7286°W	Essex	1990	64 acres (26 ha)	
Copicut Woods	Fall River; 41.705°N 71.0544°W	Bristol	2002	516 acres (209 ha)	
Cormier Woods	Uxbridge; 42.069°N 71.594°W	Worcester	2008	175 acres (71 ha)	
Cornell Farm	Dartmouth; 41.55704°N 70.95499°W	Bristol	2009	130 acres (53 ha)	
Coskata-Coatue Wildlife Refuge	Nantucket; 41.3592°N 70.0189°W	Nantucket	1974	1,117 acres (452 ha)	
Crane Beach	Ipswich; 42.6874°N 70.7696°W	Essex	1945	1,234 acres (499 ha)	
Crane Wildlife Refuge	Essex; 42.6742°N 70.7597°W	Essex	1974	697 acres (282 ha)	
Crowninshield Island	Marblehead; 42.5142°N 70.8426°W	Essex	1955	5 acres (2.0 ha)	
Mary Cummings Park	Burlington; 42.47717°N 71.1968°W	Middlessex	1927	216 acres (87 ha)	The park is owned by the City of Boston and managed by the Trustees.
DeCordova Sculpture Park and Museum	Lincoln; 42.43108°N 71.31143°W	Middlesex	2019	30 acres (12 ha)	Outdoor sculpture park and museum building operated by a separate organization until 2019.
Dexter Drumlin	Lancaster; 42.4489°N 71.6872°W	Worcester	1999	38 acres (15 ha)	
Dinosaur Footprints	Holyoke; 42.2417°N 72.6233°W	Hampden	1935	8 acres (3.2 ha)	
Doane's Falls	Royalston; 42.649°N 72.200°W	Worcester	1959	173 acres (70 ha)	
Doyle Reservation	Leominster; 42.5481°N 71.7742°W	Worcester	1981	50 acres (20 ha)	
Dry Hill	New Marlborough; 42.1347°N 73.2267°W	Berkshire	2000	206 acres (83 ha)	
Dunes' Edge Campground	Provincetown; 42.062431°N 70.186234°W	Barnstable	2013	17 acres (6.9 ha)	
East Over Reservation	Rochester; 41.7467°N 70.8083°W	Plymouth	2005	75 acres (30 ha)	
Elliott Laurel	Phillipston; 42.4944°N 72.1753°W	Worcester	1941	33 acres (13 ha)	
Farandnear	Shirley; 42.56702°N 71.65564°W	Middlesex	2011	89 acres (36 ha)	
The FARM Institute	Edgartown; 41.3617°N 70.5174°W	Dukes	Managed since 2016	162 acres (66 ha)	
Field Farm	Williamstown; 42.6661°N 73.2611°W	Berkshire	1984	316 acres (128 ha)	
Fork Factory Brook	Medfield; 42.2097°N 71.2745°W	Norfolk	1966	135 acres (55 ha)	
Fruitlands Museum	Harvard; 42°29′37″N 71°36′47″W	Worcester	2016	210 acres (85 ha)	Fruitlands, a privately owned museum that opened in 1914, was acquired by the Trustees in 2016.
Gerry Island	Marblehead; 42.5106°N 70.84263°W	Essex	2018	1.5 acres (0.61 ha)	
Glendale Falls	Middlefield; 42.3508°N 72.9661°W	Hampshire	1964	1.5 acres (0.61 ha)	
Goose Pond Reservation	Lee; 42.2815°N 73.1941°W	Berkshire	1986	112 acres (45 ha)	
Greenwood Farm	Ipswich; 42.6933°N 70.8167°W	Essex	1975	216 acres (87 ha)	
Halibut Point Reservation	Rockport; 42.6911°N 70.6289°W	Essex	1934	12 acres (4.9 ha)	Adjacent to Halibut Point State Park
Hamlin Reservation	Ipswich; 42.6694°N 70.81°W	Essex	1993	135 acres (55 ha)	
Allen C. Haskell Public Gardens	New Bedford; 41.655°N 70.946°W	Bristol	2013	6 acres (2.4 ha)	
Holmes Reservation	Plymouth; 41.9692°N 70.6786°W	Plymouth	1944	26 acres (11 ha)	
Governor Hutchinson's Field	Milton; 42.2655°N 71.0652°W	Norfolk	1898	10 acres (4.0 ha)	
Jacobs Hill	Royalston; 42.6752°N 72.2028°W	Worcester	1975	173 acres (70 ha)	
Jewell Hill	Ashby; 42.6370°N 71.85786°W	Middlesex	2020	296 acres (120 ha)	
Land of Providence	Holyoke; 42.16565°N 72.6325°W	Hampden	2009	25 acres (10 ha)	
Little Tom Mountain	Holyoke; 42.2491°N 72.6332°W	Hampden	2002	72 acres (29 ha)	
Long Hill	Beverly; 42.5852°N 70.8437°W	Essex	1979	114 acres (46 ha)	
Long Point Wildlife Refuge	West Tisbury; 41.3606°N 70.6333°W	Dukes	1979	632 acres (256 ha)	
Lowell Holly	Mashpee / Sandwich; 41.6677°N 70.4764°W	Barnstable	1942	135 acres (55 ha)	
Lucy Stone Home Site	West Brookfield; 42.2576°N 72.1884°W	Worcester	2002	61 acres (25 ha)	
Lyman Reserve	Bourne / Plymouth / Wareham; 41.7639°N 70.6315°W	Plymouth/ Barnstable	2001	210 acres (85 ha)	
Malcolm Preserve	Carlisle; 42.5153°N 71.3433°W	Middlesex	1998	11 acres (4.5 ha)	
Mashpee River Reservation	Mashpee; 41.6228°N 70.4808°W	Barnstable	1959	248 acres (100 ha)	
McLennan Reservation	Otis / Tyringham; 42.2214°N 73.1747°W	Berkshire	1976	594 acres (240 ha)	
Medfield Meadow Lots	Medfield; 42.2031°N 71.3433°W	Norfolk	1968	16 acres (6.5 ha)	
Medfield Rhododendrons	Medfield; 42.1764°N 71.3055°W	Norfolk	1934	196 acres (79 ha)	
Menemsha Hills	Chilmark; 41.3706°N 70.7514°W	Dukes	1966	211 acres (85 ha)	
Millborn Farm	Millis; 42.19893°N 71.346333°W	Norfolk	2024	195 acres (79 ha)	Opened to the public in 2026
Misery Islands	Salem; 42.5473°N 70.798°W	Essex	1935	87 acres (35 ha)	
Mission House	Stockbridge; 42.2832°N 73.3159°W	Berkshire	1948	0.5 acres (0.20 ha)	
The Monoliths	Manchester-by-the-Sea; 42.5981°N 70.7669°W	Essex	1957	116 acres (47 ha)	Two dramatic examples of glacial erratics; formerly known as Agassiz Rock.
Monument Mountain	Great Barrington; 42.2473°N 73.3407°W	Berkshire	1899	503 acres (204 ha)	
Moose Hill Farm	Sharon; 42.1275°N 71.2104°W	Norfolk	2005	347 acres (140 ha)	
Moraine Farm	Beverly; 42.5863°N 70.8986°W	Essex	2010	78 acres (32 ha)	This property was first opened to the public in June 2024.
Mount Ann Park	Gloucester; 42.6134°N 70.7203°W	Essex	1897	87 acres (35 ha)	This property has had no public access since the construction of Route 128.
Mount Warner	North Hadley; 42.3797°N 72.5777°W	Hampshire	1986	156 acres (63 ha)	
Mountain Meadow Preserve	Williamstown / Pownal, VT; 42.738°N 73.207°W	Berkshire/ Bennington	1998	176 acres (71 ha)	
Mytoi	Edgartown; 41.3758°N 70.4586°W	Dukes	1976	14 acres (5.7 ha)	
Naumkeag	Stockbridge; 42.2897°N 73.3159°W	Berkshire	1959	48 acres (19 ha)	
Noanet Woodlands	Dover; 42.247°N 71.269°W	Norfolk	1984	695 acres (281 ha)	
Noon Hill	Medfield; 42.158°N 71.306°W	Norfolk	1959	204 acres (83 ha)	
Norris Reservation	Norwell; 42.1596°N 70.7909°W	Plymouth	1970	129 acres (52 ha)	
North Common Meadow	Petersham; 42.4944°N 72.1753°W	Worcester	1975	25 acres (10 ha)	
Notchview	Windsor; 42.5053°N 73.0367°W	Berkshire	1965	3,108 acres (1,258 ha)	
Old Manse	Concord; 42.4683°N 71.3494°W	Middlesex	1939	9 acres (3.6 ha)	
Old Town Hill	Newbury; 42.769°N 70.857°W	Essex	1952	531 acres (215 ha)	
Peaked Mountain	Monson; 42.0467°N 72.3397°W	Hampden	1999	296 acres (120 ha)	
Pegan Hill	Dover / Natick; 42.2480°N 71.3038°W	Norfolk / Middlesex	1956	32 acres (13 ha)	
Peters Reservation	Dover; 42.2378°N 71.3267°W	Norfolk	1988	97 acres (39 ha)	
Petticoat Hill	Williamsburg; 42.3817°N 72.7447°W	Hampshire	1905	60 acres (24 ha)	
Pierce Reservation	Milton; 42.2660°N 71.0628°W	Norfolk	1957	4 acres (1.6 ha)	
Pine and Hemlock Knoll	Wenham; 42.616°N 70.901°W	Essex	1936	14 acres (5.7 ha)	
Powisset Farm	Dover; 42.225°N 71.260°W	Norfolk	1985	124 acres (50 ha)	
Questing	New Marlborough; 42.1219°N 73.2518°W	Berkshire	1996	438 acres (177 ha)	
Quinebaug Woods	Holland; 42.0696°N 72.156°W	Hampden	2001	36 acres (15 ha)	
Ravenswood Park	Gloucester; 42.5944°N 70.6953°W	Essex	1993	600 acres (240 ha)	
Redemption Rock	Princeton; 42.5067°N 71.8697°W	Worcester	1953	0.25 acres (0.10 ha)	
Rock House Reservation	West Brookfield; 42.2697°N 72.1972°W	Worcester	1993	135 acres (55 ha)	
Rocky Narrows	Sherborn; 42.2259°N 71.3542°W	Middlesex	1897	227 acres (92 ha)	
Rocky Woods	Medfield; 42.2095°N 71.2762°W	Norfolk	1942	491 acres (199 ha)	
Royalston Falls	Royalston; 42.7144°N 72.2453°W	Worcester	1951	217 acres (88 ha)	
Shattuck Reservation	Medfield; 42.1648°N 71.3185°W	Norfolk	1970	245 acres (99 ha)	
Signal Hill	Canton; 42.185°N 71.159°W	Norfolk	2005	150 acres (61 ha)	
Slocum's River Reserve	Dartmouth; 41.5519°N 71.0092°W	Bristol	2000	47 acres (19 ha)	
Stavros Reservation	Essex; 42.6508°N 70.7868°W	Essex	1982	74 acres (30 ha)	
The Stevens-Coolidge Place	North Andover; 42.6814°N 71.1181°W	Essex	1962	91 acres (37 ha)	
Swift River Reservation	Petersham; 42.4467°N 72.1808°W	Worcester	1983	439 acres (178 ha)	
Tantiusques	Sturbridge; 42.0572°N 72.1311°W	Worcester	1962	57 acres (23 ha)	
Tully Lake Campground	Royalston; 42.6446°N 72.2157°W	Worcester	Managed since 1999	200 acres (81 ha)	The campground is owned by the United States Army Corps of Engineers and managed by the Trustees.
Two Mile Farm	Marshfield; 42.1199°N 70.7666°W	Plymouth	1993	68 acres (28 ha)	
Tyringham Cobble	Tyringham; 42.245°N 73.2092°W	Berkshire	1963	206 acres (83 ha)	
Ward Reservation	Andover / North Andover; 42.6411°N 71.1058°W	Essex	1940	695 acres (281 ha)	
Wasque	Edgartown; 41.3514°N 70.4578°W	Dukes	1967	200 acres (81 ha)	
Weir Hill	North Andover; 42.6936°N 71.1042°W	Essex	1968	194 acres (79 ha)	
Weir River Farm	Hingham; 42.24°N 70.8536°W	Plymouth	1999	75 acres (30 ha)	
Westport Town Farm	Westport; 41.5804°N 71.0798°W	Bristol	managed since 2007	40 acres (16 ha)	The property is owned by the Town of Westport and managed by the Trustees.
Whitney and Thayer Woods	Cohasset / Hingham; 42.2317°N 70.8397°W	Norfolk/ Plymouth	1933	824 acres (333 ha)	
World's End	Hingham; 42.27°N 70.88°W	Plymouth	1967	251 acres (102 ha)	

== Property guidebook ==
Members may receive a copy of The Trustees' own Property Guide.
