= Dry Hill (disambiguation) =

Dry Hill and Dryhill may refer to:

- Dryhill, village in Kent
- Dry Hill, nature preserve in Massachusetts
- Dry Hill, Illinois, an unincorporated community
- Dry Hill, West Virginia, an unincorporated community in Raleigh County
- Dryhill, Kentucky
