= Noon Hill =

Noon Hill may refer to:

- Noon Hill (reservation)
- Noon Hill (North West England)
