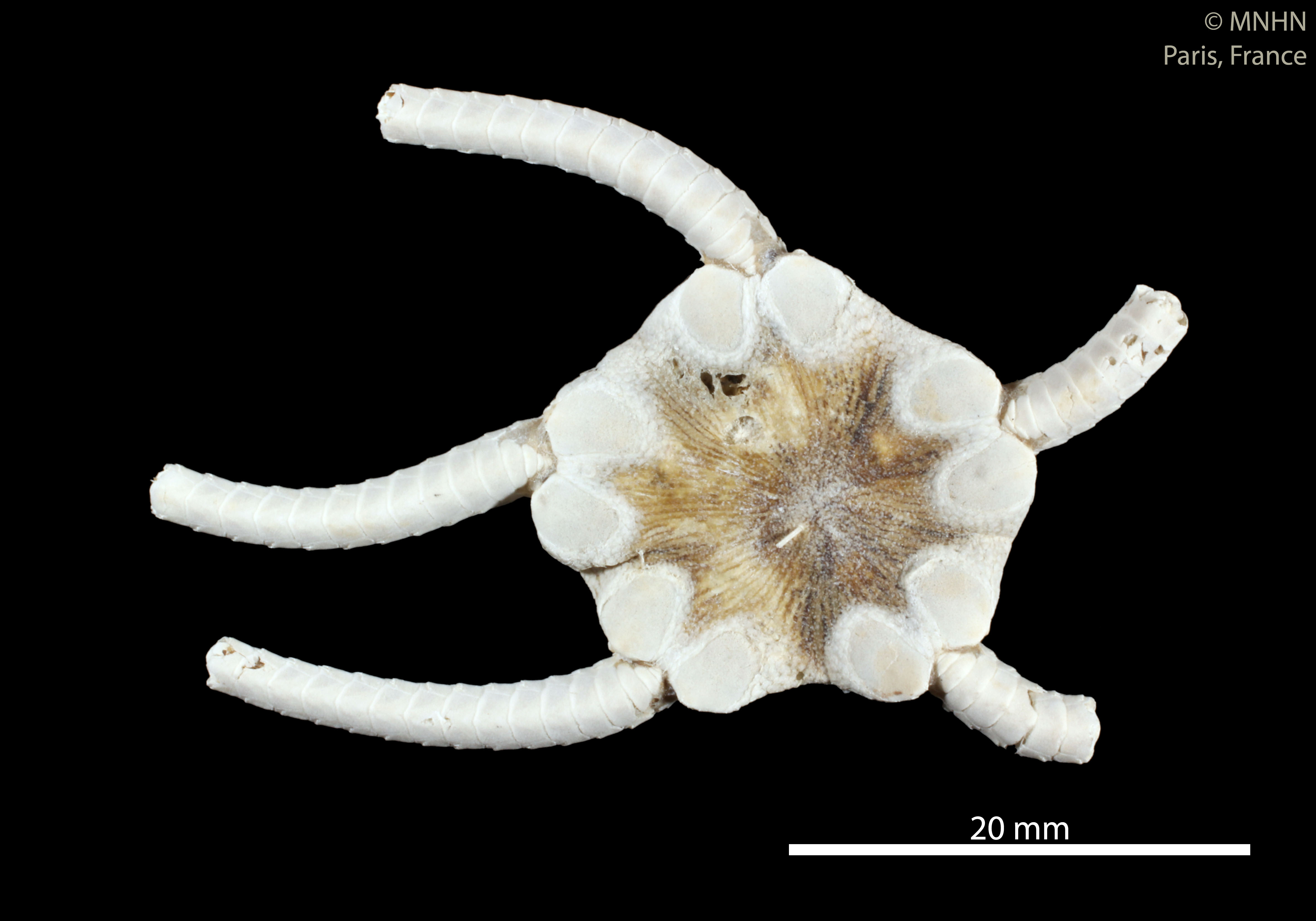
- Dried preserved specimen of Ophiernus seminudus (incomplete arms)

Scientific classification
- Kingdom: Animalia
- Phylum: Echinodermata
- Class: Ophiuroidea
- Order: Ophioleucida
- Family: Ophiernidae
- Genus: Ophiernus; Lyman, 1878

Type species
- Ophiernus vallincola (Lyman, 1878)

Species
- 4, see text

= Ophiernus =

Genus of brittle stars

Ophiernus is a genus of brittle stars in the monogeneric family Ophiernidae. It has four species.

== Taxonomy ==
The family Ophiernidae was described by O'Hara et al., in 2018.

The genus has the following four species.

- Ophiernus alepidotus (Madsen, 1977)
- Ophiernus quadrispinus (Koehler, 1907)
- Ophiernus seminudus (Lütken & Mortensen, 1899)
- Ophiernus vallincola (Lyman, 1878)
