= Theodore Lyman III =

Natural scientist, military staff officer, and politician

Theodore Lyman
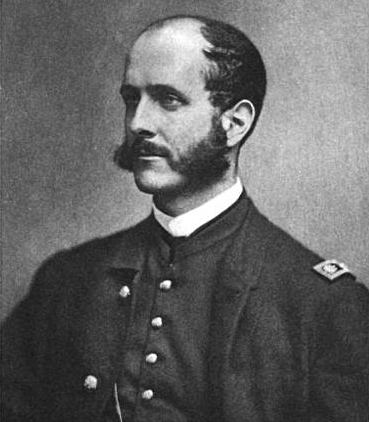
- Lyman in uniform c. 1863–65

Member of the U.S. House of Representatives from Massachusetts's 9th district
- In office March 4, 1883 – March 3, 1885
- Preceded by: William W. Rice
- Succeeded by: Frederick D. Ely

Personal details
- Born: August 23, 1833 Waltham, Massachusetts, U.S.
- Died: September 9, 1897 (aged 64) Nahant, Massachusetts, U.S.
- Spouse: Elizabeth Russell
- Children: Cora Lyman, Theodore Lyman IV and Henry Lyman
- Parent: Theodore Lyman II (father)

Military service
- Allegiance: United States of America; Union
- Branch/service: (United States) Union Army
- Years of service: May 1863 to April 20, 1865
- Rank: Lieutenant Colonel
- Unit: Army of the Potomac
- Battles/wars: American Civil War: Battle of Cold Harbor; Siege of Petersburg

Theodore Lyman III (August 23, 1833 – September 9, 1897) was a natural scientist, military staff officer during the American Civil War, and United States representative from Massachusetts.

== Biography ==
Lyman was born in Waltham, Massachusetts, on August 23, 1833, son of Boston mayor Theodore Lyman II and Mary Henderson of a prominent New York family.

The first Theodore, Lyman's grandfather, founded a successful shipping firm in the 1790s in York, Maine, which provided the basis for the family fortune. Theodore Lyman I sought out noted Salem architect, Samuel McIntire, to design and build his country seat, known as the Vale, in the Boston suburb of Waltham. Now known as The Lyman Estate, it is today a park and house museum owned by Historic New England. Mayor Lyman (Theodore II) served two terms and retired from public office in 1836 upon the sudden death of his wife Mary. His son Ted, as he was known by family and friends, was educated by private tutors and traveled extensively in Europe with his father. Mayor Lyman died in 1849, possibly from a stroke. Young Theodore was sixteen years old.

From his father, he inherited a 60-acre (240,000 m²) working farm in Brookline, Massachusetts, called Singletree. His older sister, Cora, inherited the town house on Beacon Hill, and the two split stocks and investment income amounting to $430,000. Lyman's uncle, George Williams Lyman, took the deed to the Vale. Cora's husband, Gardner Howland Shaw, guided Theodore into Harvard University where he was graduated in 1855 near the top of his class. Theodore then entered the University's Lawrence Scientific School and studied under professor Louis Agassiz, one of the preeminent natural scientists of the 19th century. He graduated with honors in 1858. Lyman was a founding member and underwriter of Harvard's Museum of Comparative Anatomy. Lyman first met future major-general George Gordon Meade in 1856 while conducting research on starfish in Florida. Lieutenant Meade was there overseeing construction of lighthouses for the Army Corps of Engineers. They became friends and corresponded frequently prior to the Civil War.

Ted Lyman married Elizabeth "Mimi" Russell in 1858. Elizabeth was the daughter of George Robert Russell of Russell & Company, a successful merchant turned philanthropist. Mimi's mother was Sarah Parkman Shaw. Colonel Robert Gould Shaw, commander of the famed 54th Massachusetts Infantry (portrayed in the movie "Glory"), was Mimi's first cousin. On the eve of the Civil War, Ted and Mimi embarked on a grand tour of Europe's capitals. Their first child, Cora, was born in 1862 in Florence, Italy.

Lyman returned to the United States in May 1863 and joined the staff of Major General George G. Meade as an aide-de-camp with a commission as lieutenant-colonel from Governor Andrew of Massachusetts. Lyman served under Meade for the remainder of the war, from September 2, 1863, to April 20, 1865. During this time, he acted as headquarters archivist. He saw action on the battlefield when he carried flags of truce through hostile lines at Cold Harbor and Petersburg. His published letters and notebooks establish him as the preeminent recorder of events and personalities within the headquarters of the Army of the Potomac. After the war, he became a companion of the Massachusetts Commandery of the Loyal Legion.

After the war he became a state Fish Commissioner, later a federal commissioner, and he was one of the first scientists to advocate the widespread use of fish ladders, known then as "fishways." He was a member of the American Academy of Arts and Sciences and of the National Academy of Sciences, a trustee of the Peabody Education Fund, and an overseer of Harvard University. In his role as overseer he was influential in getting his cousin Charles W. Eliot elected as President of Harvard, a position Eliot held for near forty years. Lyman was also active in the Massachusetts Historical Society, the Society of the Army of the Potomac, and the Military Historical Society of Massachusetts.

Ted and Mimi's daughter Cora died in 1869 of a "brain fever." The couple subsequently raised two boys, Theodore IV and Henry. Theodore Lyman IV attained renown as a physicist.

Lyman was elected as an Independent Republican representative to the Forty-eighth Congress (March 4, 1883 – March 3, 1885) on a reform platform. The bipartisan coalition that put him into office collapsed by 1885, and he was passed over for nomination for a second term. He retired to Singletree in Brookline, where he devoted himself to the care of his sons. Through the last decade of his life, he suffered from a debilitating nervous disease. He gradually lost use of his limbs and was unable to continue work at the Museum of Comparative Zoology. Despite his paralysis, he was lucid and retained a sense of humor until the end of his life. He died in Nahant, Massachusetts, on September 9, 1897, and was buried in Mount Auburn Cemetery in Cambridge.

During his life, Theodore Lyman acquired hundreds of acres of land on Buttermilk Bay, Cape Cod, to preserve the spawning grounds of the ocean running red brook trout. His legacy and summer cottage are preserved today as the Lyman Reserve, located in Wareham, Plymouth and Bourne. The property is open to the public and managed by The Trustees of Reservations.

== Bibliography ==
- Adams, Charles Francis, Jr. Theodore Lyman (1833–1897) and Robert Charles Winthrop, Jr. (1834–1905): Two Memoirs Prepared by Charles Francis Adams for the Massachusetts Historical Society. Cambridge: John Wilson and Son, 1906.
- Agassiz, George R. Meade's Headquarters 1863-1865 Letters of Colonel Theodore Lyman. Boston: The Atlantic Monthly Press.
- Bowditch, Henry P. Biographical Memoir of Theodore Lyman. Biographical Memoirs, National Academy of Sciences, vol. 5, 141–154. Washington, DC, 1905.
- Coleman, Lyman. Genealogy of the Lyman Family in Great Britain and America. Albany, NY: Munsell, 1872.
- Crawford, Mary. Famous Families of Massachusetts, 2 vols. Boston: Little, Brown, 1930.
- Lyman, Theodore. With Grant and Meade from the Wilderness to Appomattox. Letters Selected and Edited by George R. Agassiz; Introduction to the Bison Book edition by Brooks D. Simpson. Lincoln: University of Nebraska Press, 1994.
- Lyman, Theodore. Meade's Army: the Private Notebooks of Lt. Col. Theodore Lyman. Edited by David W. Lowe. Foreword by John Y. Simon. Kent, OH: Kent State University Press, 2007
- Lyman, Theodore, Meade's Headquarters, 1863-1865: Letters of Colonel Theodore Lyman from the Wilderness to Appomattox, Massachusetts Historical Society, 1922.

U.S. House of Representatives
Preceded by William W. Rice	Member of the U.S. House of Representatives from Massachusetts's 9th congressional district March 4, 1883–March 3, 1885	Succeeded by Fredrick D. Ely
