= Peters Reservation =

Nature reserve in Dover, Massachusetts

Coordinates: 42°14′16″N 71°19′36″W

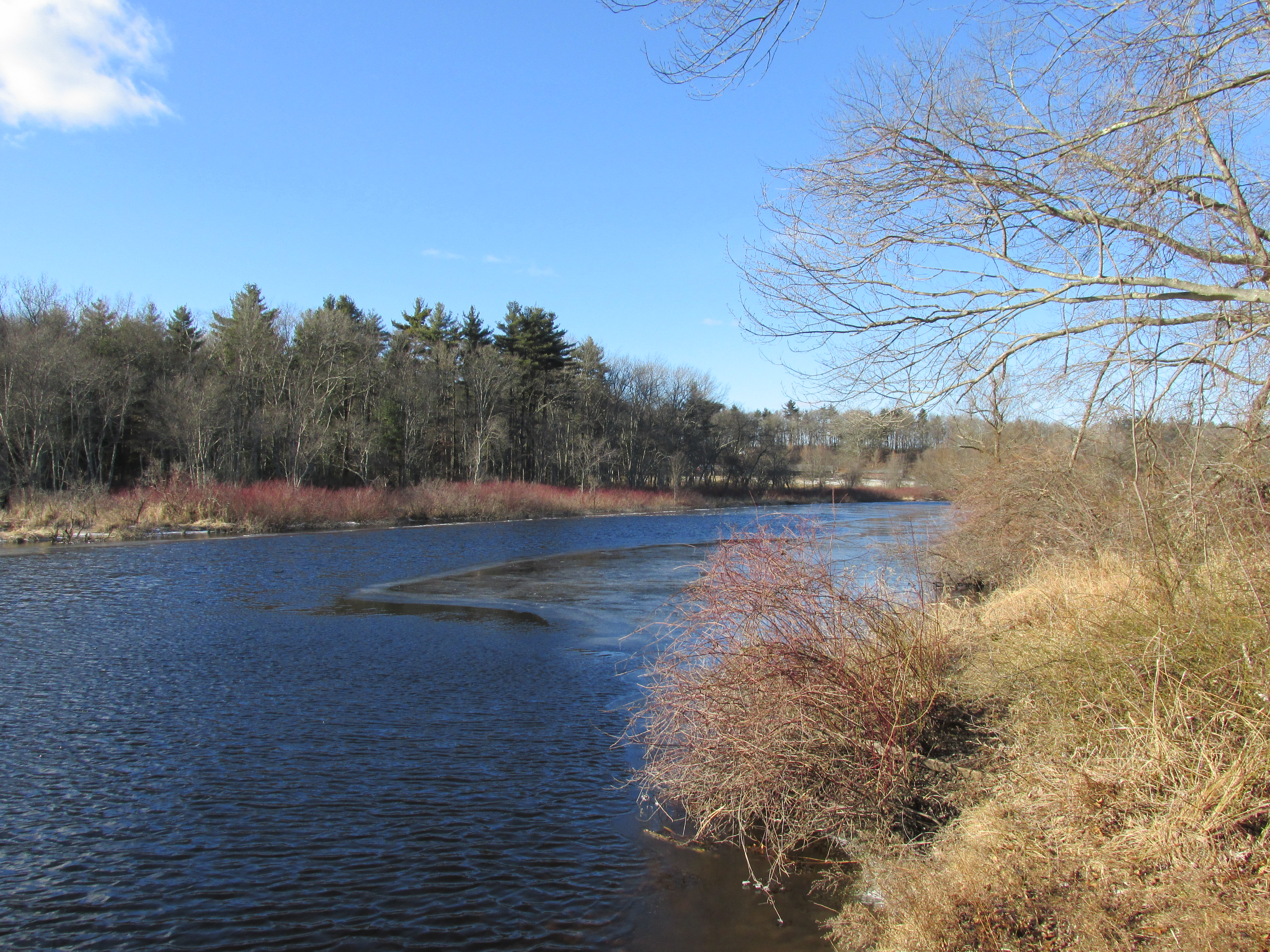
Charles River

Peters Reservation is a nature reserve located in Dover, Massachusetts. The property is owned by The Trustees of Reservations; the reservation's first parcels were received as a gift in 1988. The reservation is located across Farm Street from the Chase Woodlands, another Trustees-managed property. The Charles River Link Trail crosses both reservations.
