= Malcolm Preserve =

Nature reserve in Carlisle, Massachusetts

Coordinates: 42.5153°N 71.3433°W

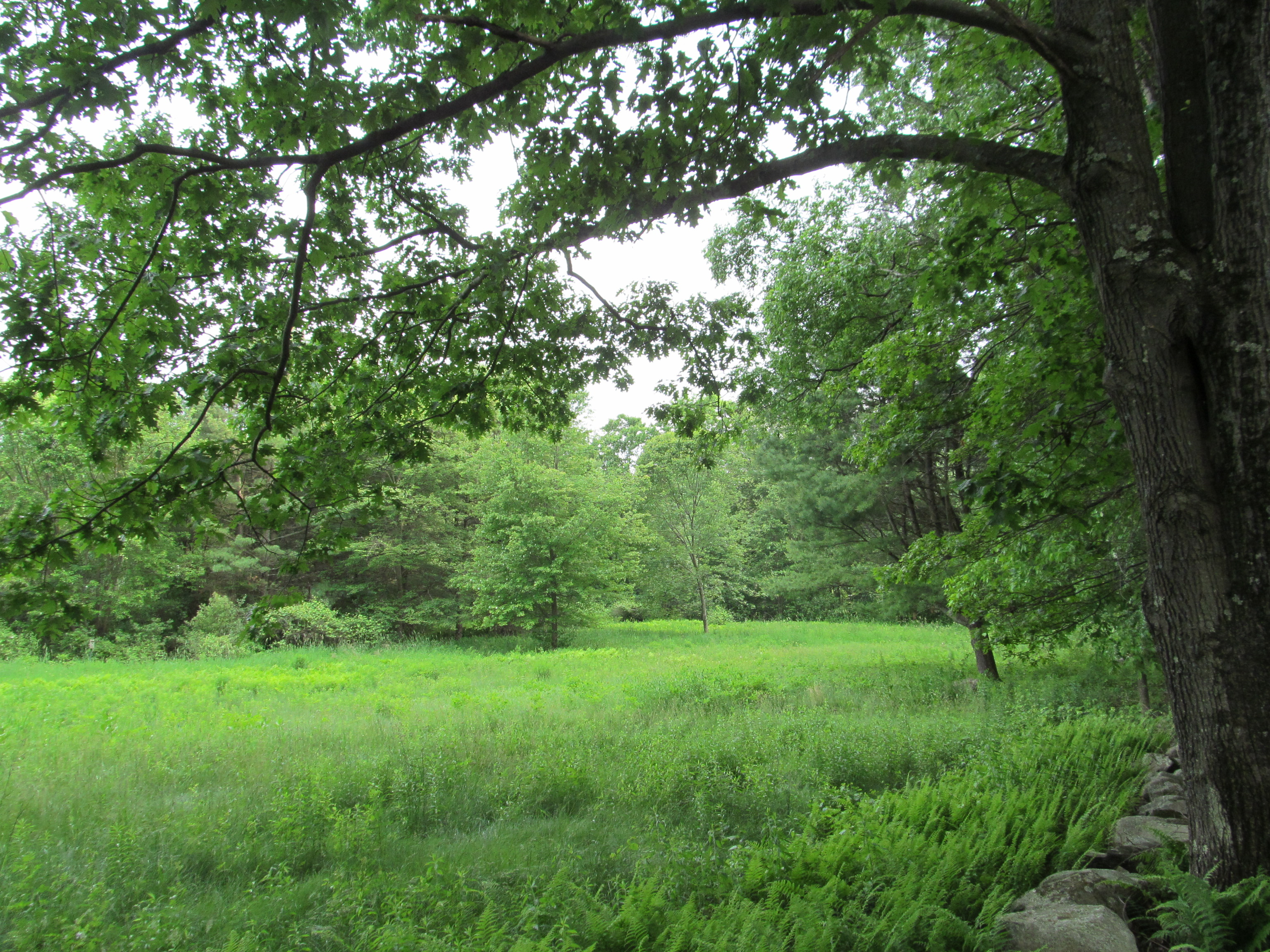
Malcolm Preserve

The Malcolm Preserve is an 11-acre (45,000 m^{2}) nature reserve in Carlisle, Massachusetts. It is co-managed by the Trustees of Reservations and the Carlisle Conservation Foundation. Composed of former farmland, the preserve has a half-mile trail that connects to trails in Estabrook Woods and the Punkatasset Reserve in Concord.

It was purchased for preservation in 1998 by the Carlisle Conservation Foundation and The Trustees of Reservations.
