= Rock House Reservation =

Land preserve in Massachusetts, US

Coordinates: 42°16′7.99″N 72°11′47.51″W

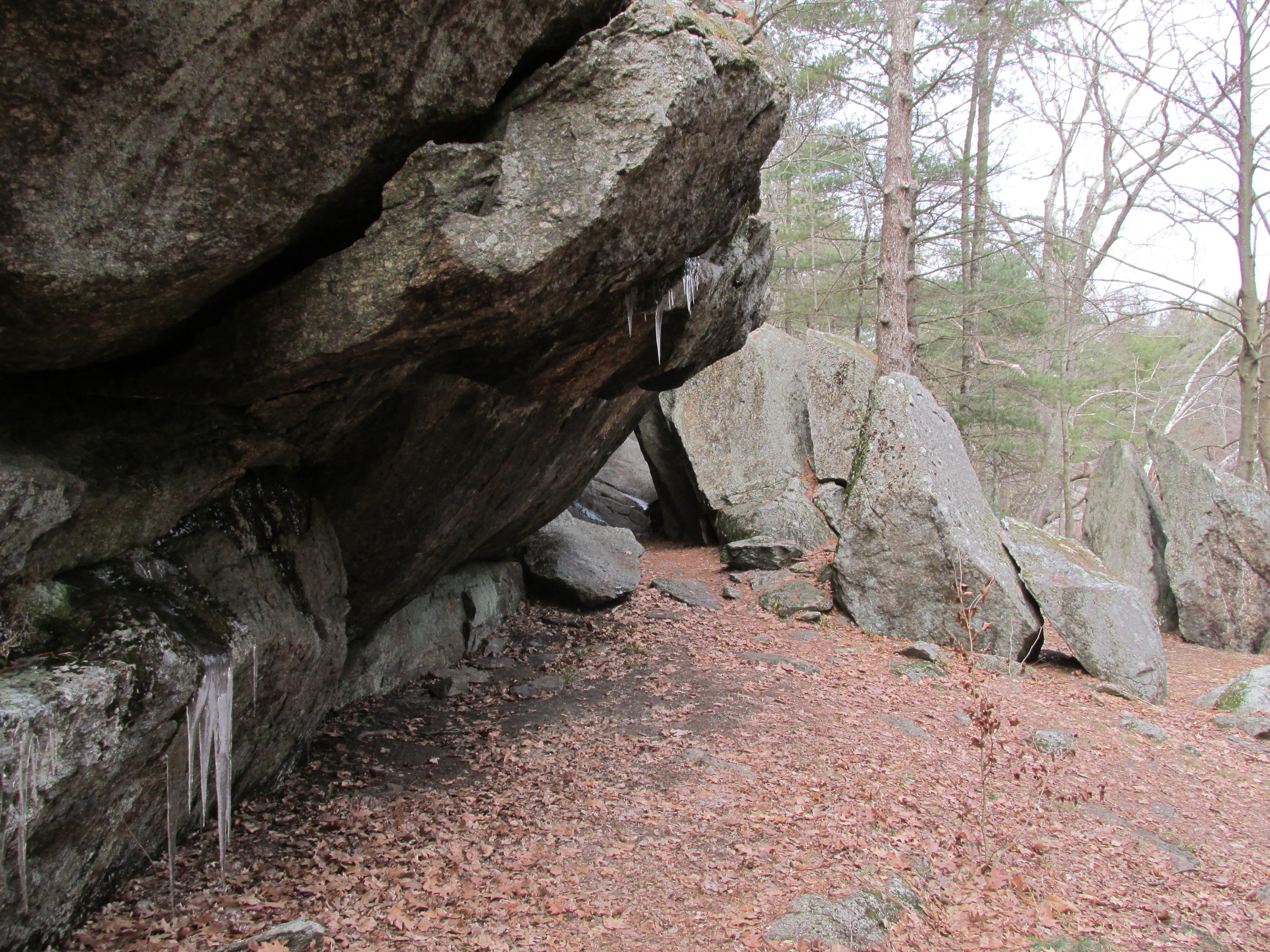
- Rock shelter
- Interactive map of Rock House Reservation
- Established: 1993
- Operator: The Trustees of Reservations
- Website: Rock House Reservation

The Rock House Reservation is a 196-acre (79 ha) open space preserve located in West Brookfield, Massachusetts. The property, acquired in 1993 by the land conservation non-profit organization The Trustees of Reservations, is named for a natural rock shelter once used as a winter camp by Native Americans. Its location near two, long Native American footpaths suggests that it may also have been a trail camp and meeting place.

The Rock House Reservation is located off Massachusetts Route 9 and offers 3 miles (4.8 km) of hiking trails, an interpretive center, a butterfly garden, and scenic vistas. Boulder strewn Carter Pond occupies the center of the property. The reservation is open to hiking, picnicking, and cross country skiing. Horseback riding and mountain biking are allowed on certain parts of the property.

== History ==
During the last ice age when the southern movement of the Wisconsin Glacier transformed the landscape producing unique rock formations and outcroppings. Today two glacially formed outcroppings are still present on the property. These formations are known as Balance Rock and the Rock House Shelter. After the ice age, archaeologists believe Native Americans used the Rock House Shelter as a winter camp, trail camp and/or meeting place.

In the mid 17th century, the forests of West Brookfield were cleared by colonists for farming. In 1866, pastures around the Rock House were added to a 281-acre farm on Ragged Hill Road owned by William Adams whose family would tend the land for more than 125 years. During the first two decades of the 20th century, Rock House was a popular stop on the "Copper Line", an electric trolley that ran between West Brookfield and Ware.

Visitors came to picnic in the abandoned pastures and explore this historic Native American landmark. Later the area was used as a country retreat by Arthur Carter, a family descendant of the Adams who owned the land since the mid-1800s. Arthur built a small cabin in 1930, today’s Trailside Museum, and created Carter Pond by building an earthen dam. The property was gifted to The Trustees of Reservations in 1993.

It is located next to the Lucy Stone Home Site, where suffragist Lucy Stone was born.

== Ownership History ==
The Rock House Reservation was an anonymous gift, with endowment, in 1993 in memory of William Adams. Additional land was then purchased in 2002. The Rock House Reservation began with the gift of a conservation restriction to The Trustees of Reservations by an anonymous donor in 1977 followed by a donation of the fee interest in 1993, in memory of William Adams. The reservation was expanded by 58 acres in 2002 with the addition of 50 acres on the Reservation’s western border, which had been acquired from John Cregan and Donald Richards, and an additional 8 acres, west of the Cregan and Richards parcel, from Maurice Labbe.

== Natural Resources ==
The Rock House reservation is located in the Lower Worcester Plateau/Eastern Connecticut Upland Ecoregion. Elevations at the Rock House range between 600 feet near its lowest elevation to more than 1,020 feet at its highest which makes up nearly the full range of elevation for the ecoregion. Rock outcrops and large surface boulders are common, and most are covered with lichens and ferns. The outcrop that gives the Reservation its name is among the largest and most dramatic.

Post agricultural second-growth mixed forest and conifer plantations cover much of the eastern half of the Reservation while an oak dominated forest, possibly containing primary forest, covers the western half. Carter’s Pond is a primary scenic feature near the center of the property. The two and a half acre pond is very shallow and was created in the 1920s or 1930s. A power line also bisects the Reservation creating early successional habitat. Several intermittent streams flow through the property, flowing south towards Route 9 and the Ware River. Woodland vernal pools are uncommon.

== Carter Pond ==
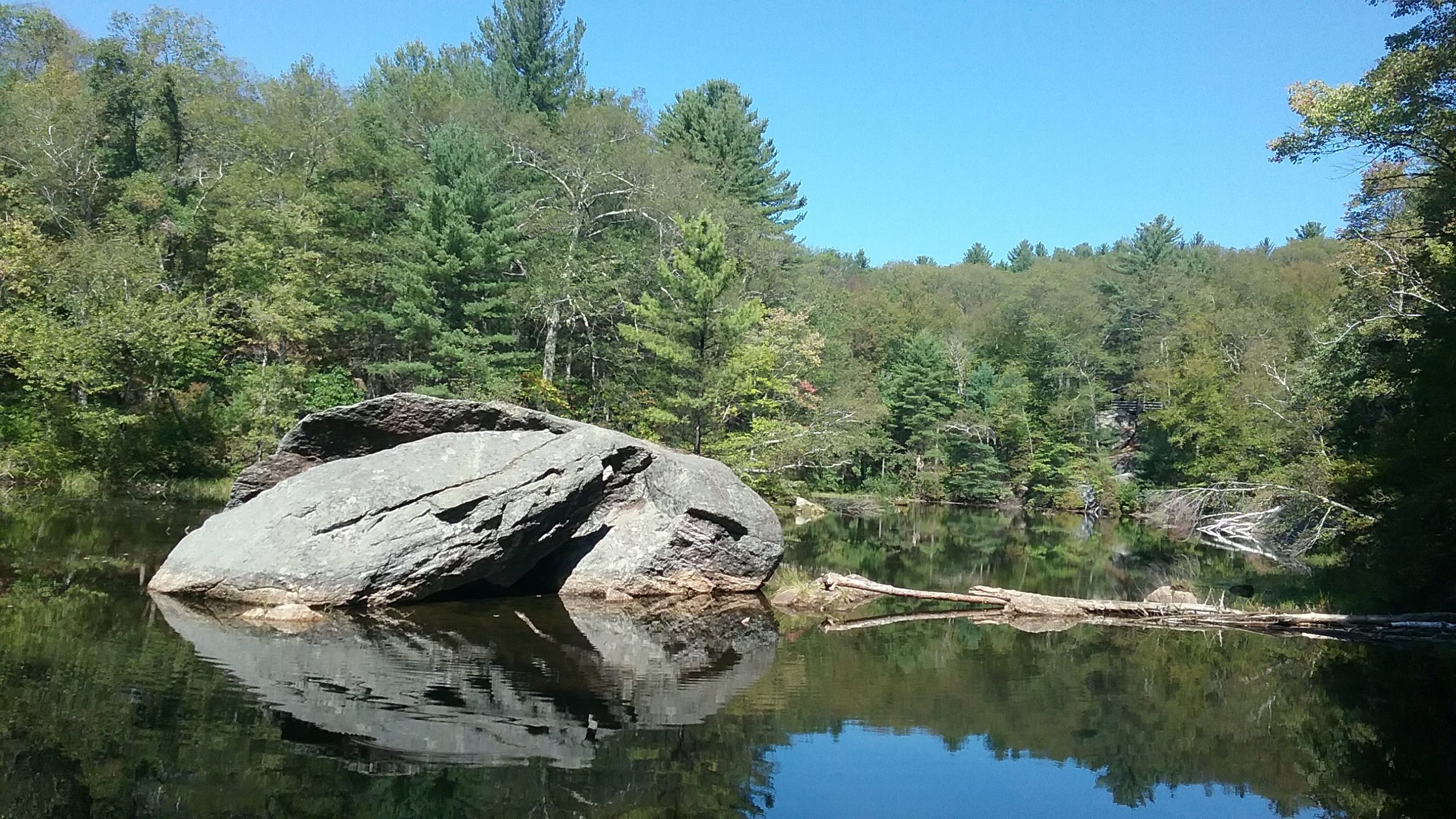
View of Carter Pond

Carter Pond is a relatively shallow pond, with an area of about 2.5 acres and a watershed of about 8 acres. The pond has a healthy riparian zone (characterized by woody trees and shrubs) and healthy shoreline vegetation (characterized by sedges, grasses, rushes). Both of these areas provide important habitat for dragonflies, damselflies, mammals and amphibians.

The pond has an average depth of 1 meter and soft substrate that is characterized by inorganic sediment and undecomposed organic matter. Sunlight reaches the bottom of the substrate 40% of the time. The pond has a healthy pH and alkalinity, low levels of nitrates, phosphates and dissolved oxygen and high levels of suspended solids. Biologically, there is a high diversity of macroinvertebrate and fish populations but a low diversity and of submerged and floating aquatic plants.

It is unusual that Carter Pond has a low diversity of submerged aquatic plants, because shallow ponds usually have plants growing from shore to shore. In the case of Carter Pond, plant growth and reproduction might be limited by low levels of nitrogen and phosphorus. These nutrient deficiencies may be caused by the pond’s small pond-to-watershed ratio and/or lack of nutrient inflow from an upstream source. In addition, it is possible that the spring that feeds Carter Pond is nutrient-poor, although additional water quality testing will be needed to confirm or disprove this theory.

Carter Pond’s low abundance of aquatic plants may be contributing to another problem the pond is experiencing: low dissolved oxygen. This is because dissolved oxygen often enters the water as a byproduct of aquatic-plant photosynthesis. Thus, low numbers of aquatic plants can limit the amount of dissolved oxygen that enters the water. Lack of aeration due to stagnant water and/or warm water temperatures could also contribute to the low levels of dissolved oxygen in Carter Pond.

Carter Pond is also experiencing high levels of inorganic sediment in the water column. A visual observation of sediment deposition on the north bank suggests that sediment might be eroding into the pond from the north shore after heavy rains. This deposition could be a problem because it limits transparency, decreases benthic habitat diversity, and builds up on the bottom of the pond.

Carter Pond is also dealing with a build-up of organic matter, such as leaves and sticks, on the bottom of the pond. It is currently unclear why this accumulation is greater than decay, but it could be a result of low pond turnover rates, low numbers of decomposer in the benthic environments, or low dissolved oxygen

== Threats to Natural Resources ==
Erosion poses a major threat to this property along many of the trail. One of the trails most affected is the Fire Road, which is prone to erosion, which causes sediment to be deposited into Carter Pond. These deposits cause the siltation of the pond due which is impacts the aquatic ecosystem and could result in the eventual filling in of the pond. Recent repairs have helped to address erosion but anticipated impacts from climate change will make erosion on ongoing issue. Trail erosion is likely to increase because of recent intense thunder and rain storms, which have increased erosion.

Invasive plants are present but control efforts funded by the Landowner Incentive Program (LIP) over the past few years have helped control these species to the point that routine management should address future control needs. Knapweed is spreading along the power lines.

Deer also pose a threat to the natural resources at the reservation. When deer numbers are high, browsing pressures can impact forest regeneration and plant species composition. Current browsing pressures at Rock House do not appear to be obvious which could be due to surrounding lands and part of the Reservation which have been open to hunting.

== Recreation ==
The property is open year round, sunrise to sunset, for hiking, horseback riding, cross country skiing, and hunting (in season). Hunting is only permitted on the part of the property which lies west of the Outer Loop. Fishing is strictly prohibited. Dogs are allowed, but must be kept under voice control or on a leash. Mountain Bikes and Horseback Riders are permitted on the fire road only. The reservation offers more than 3 miles of trails and throughout the property and has moderate hiking which can be strenuous in places.
