= East Over Reservation =

Nature preserve in Massachusetts, USA

Coordinates: 41°44′48″N 70°48′30″W

The East Over Reservation is a 75-acre (300,000 m^{2}) nature preserve and working farm in Rochester, Massachusetts, USA, and is managed by the Trustees of Reservations. There are hiking trails, quarry-stone walls and a "treasure hunt", designed to test one's map reading skills. It was protected between 2003 and 2005.
