= Quinebaug Woods =

Open space preserve in Holland, Massachusetts

Coordinates: 42.069621°N 72.156033°W

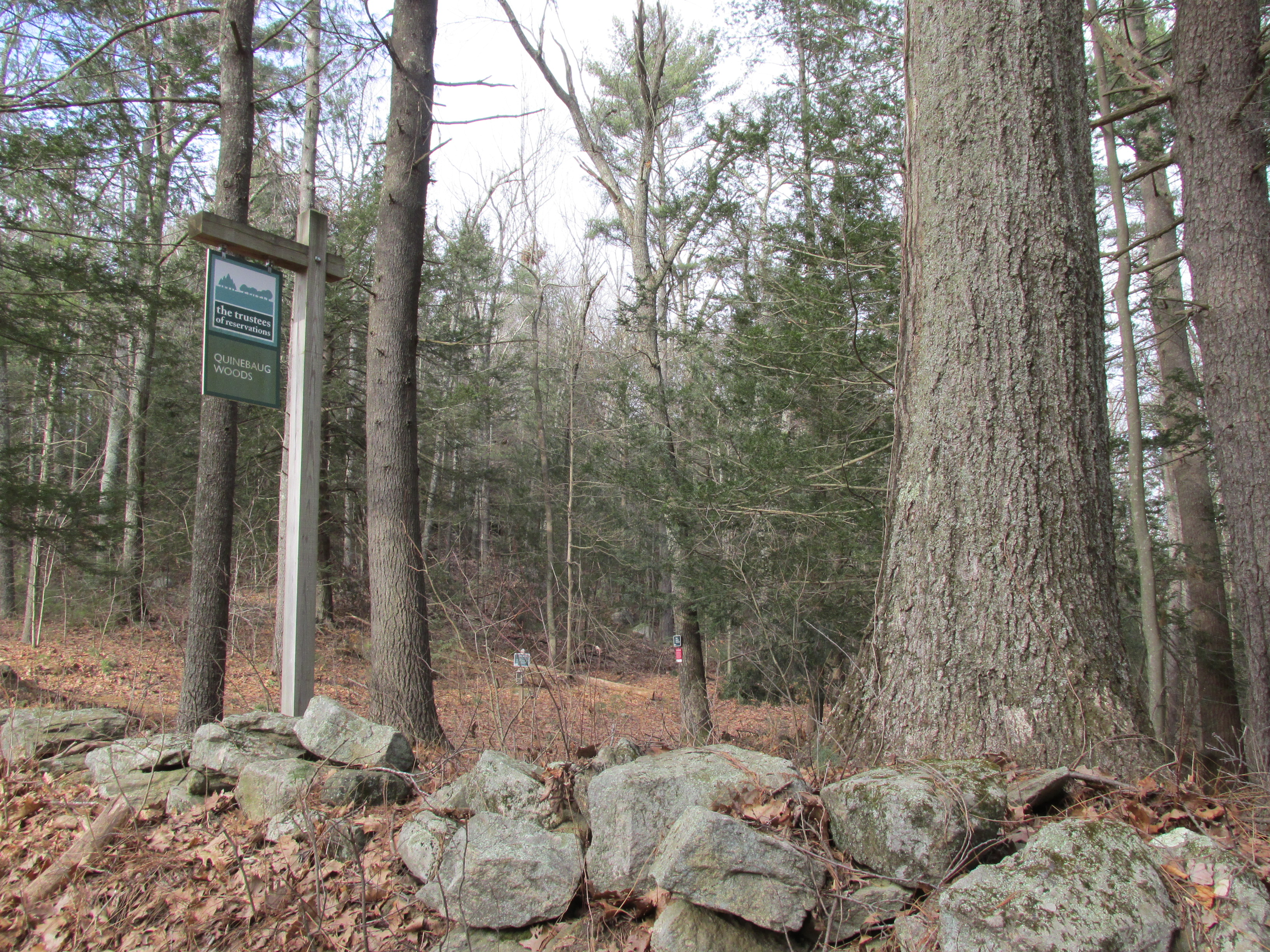
- Quinebaug Woods
- Interactive map of Quinebaug Woods
- Established: 2001
- Operator: The Trustees of Reservations
- Website: Quinebaug Woods

Quinebaug Woods is a 36-acre (15 ha) open space preserve located in Holland, Massachusetts. The property, acquired in 2001 by the land conservation non-profit organization The Trustees of Reservations, is named for the Quinebaug River, which runs through the reservation.

The reservation is located off Dug Hill Road in northeast Holland and offers 1.1 miles (1.8 km) of hiking trails, woodlands, river frontage, a scenic vista, and the remains of a 1930s cabin atop the hogback Blake Hill. The reservation is open to hiking, picnicking, horseback riding, fishing, and cross country skiing. Quinebaug Woods is part of a contiguous area of protected open space including the United States Army Corps of Engineers' East Brimfield Dam/Holland Pond Flood Control and Recreation Area.

== History ==
The area known today as the town of Holland, Massachusetts was first settled by Joseph Blodgett, who purchased land there in 1730. In 1783, Holland was incorporated as the East Parish of South Brimfield but wasn't incorporated as a town until 1835 when it achieved the necessary fifty voters. The population of Holland remained small (estimated at 300 in 1912) until the 1920s when a significant number of real estate buyers were attracted. Among these new buyers was William Haller, a professor at Barnard College of Columbia University who resided in northern New Jersey.

For over ten years Professor Haller and his family- his wife, Malleville and their three children, Bill Jr., Ben and Maria- rented a cottage on Holland Pond where they spent their summers. Then, in 1931, Haller purchased nearly one hundred acres of woodland on the west bank of the Quinebaug River. The land included a hill just north of the Hamilton Reservoir dam that was referred to locally as a “hogback”- an exposed rocky ridge. An old logging road ran to the top of the hill and, here, the Hallers built a cottage.

The Hallers visited the Quinebaug camp for many years. It had no running water or electricity. When the Haller children were grown and married, they continued to use the camp. The Hallers eventually became year-round residents of Holland. Bill Sr. and Malleville moved permanently into a small house by the lake. Their son Ben gave a parcel of land across the river from the hill to his son William to build a home and a second parcel to his sister Maria who, in turn, passed the land to her son John. Eventually, Ben had the cabin on the hill torn down, despite the protests of some family members. He felt a wilderness camp was no longer viable in the middle of the heavily settled community that Holland had become. The cabin had been repeatedly vandalized, and extensive repairs had been necessary each spring.

In 2001, Ben and Margaret Haller made a gift of their 38 acres of land on the hill, including the site of the former camp, to The Trustees of Reservations. In 2002, Quinebaug Woods became the 90th property of The Trustees of Reservations.

== Cultural Resources ==
The only known cultural resources on the reservation are the former cabin site and the original chimney still sitting atop the ridge. While it is an interesting landscape feature, this site has little historical or cultural significance either locally or regionally. To date, there have not been any efforts made to maintain the chimney as a landscape feature.

== Natural Resources ==
Quinebaug Woods is located within the Lower Worcester Plateau/Eastern Connecticut Upland Ecoregion. Forest covers the entire property. Hemlock is abundant and suppresses understory diversity. A ridgeline of exposed bedrock, also referred to as a “hogback,” is a prominent feature along the western boundary. This rock is composed of Paxton and Partridge schists, neutral to slightly acidic metamorphic rocks containing limy quartz and feldspar sandstone. Several small clearings occur along this ridgeline, as does an exemplary vernal pool. A view of the nearby hills can be seen from the largest of the clearings- the former site of the Haller cabin. The Quinebaug River forms much of the property's eastern boundary. Timber harvesting occurred throughout the 20th century, most recently in 2000.

The reservation is adjacent to significant acreage owned by the U.S. Army Corps of Engineers, the Holland Pond Recreational Area. The Leadmine Wildlife Management Area, managed by MassWildlife, is located across Sturbridge Road from the reservation. Other protected lands in the area include the Norcross Wildlife Sanctuary and The Trustees’ Tantiusques Reservation.

== Wildlife ==
In 2002, a breeding bird survey was conducted on the reservation in order to inform management of Quinebaug Woods. During the survey, a total of 37 species of birds were identified on the property including seven species listed as Massachusetts Priority Neotropical Migrant Bird Species. A male northern parula was observed along the river in June 2002. It is unlikely that this state-listed, threatened warbler is breeding on the property as it was only observed on one occasion. It is more likely that this individual was an unpaired male or a late migrant. Brown-headed cowbirds were one of the few problematic or non-native species observed. These birds pose a risk to neotropical migrants in that their habit of laying their eggs in the nests of other species impacts the productivity of native, neotropical migrants. In June 2002, a Louisiana waterthrush was observed feeding an immature cowbird.

The acreage of Quinebaug Woods alone is not large enough to support viable populations of wide-ranging species such as a barred owl or broad-winged hawk. However, in conjunction with other contiguous or nearby protected open space, the reservation plays an important role in supporting both wide-ranging and interior species. This may also be true of wide-ranging mammal species, in addition to birds.

One significant issue that has the potential to alter bird species composition at Quinebaug Woods is the loss of eastern hemlock trees from hemlock woolly adelgid (HWA). This will likely have the most significant impact on black-throated green warbler and Blackburnian warbler and blue-headed vireo, species that prefer mature mixed forest or conifers as habitat.

== Recreation ==
The Reservation is open year-round, daily, sunrise to sunset for hiking, bird watching, picnicking, horseback riding, and bow hunting (in season, with permission). There is a short loop trail that goes north along the Quinebaug River before turning west and heading up and over a steep hillside with rocky outcrops. On the exposed ridge there is a stone chimney and foundation steps, the only remains from a cabin built in 1932. From this and other vantage points, you can see Blake Hill to the east and Hamilton Reservoir to the south.
