= Menemsha Hills and The Brickyard =

Protected area in Massachusetts, US

Coordinates: 41°22′14″N 70°45′5″W

Menemsha Hills is a protected nature reserve located on Martha's Vineyard, Massachusetts in the town of Chilmark. The property is owned by The Trustees of Reservations through three grants of land, the first in 1966. The reserve is adjacent to another Trustees property, The Brickyard.
