= Medfield Meadow Lots =

Wetland meadows in Massachusetts, USA

Coordinates: 42°12′11″N 71°20′36″W

- Interactive map of Medfield Meadow Lots
- Established: 1968
- Operator: The Trustees of Reservations
- Website: Medfield Meadow Lots

Medfield Meadow Lots consist of a group of wetland meadows—Pratt Meadow, Perry Meadow, and Hinsdale Meadow—located in the Charles River floodplain within Medfield, Massachusetts, United States. The lots total 16 acres (6.5 hectares) and are accessible only by canoe or kayak. They were acquired as an open space reserve through a land donation by Henry Lee Shattuck in 1968.

The Medfield Meadow Lots are part of a cooperative effort by non-profit organizations and public agencies to protect the natural and ecological character of the Charles River. Including the meadow lots, The Trustees of Reservations have protected over 4,000 acres (1,600 hectares) of land on the Charles River floodplain.
