= Cedariver =

Open space reserve in the U.S. state of Massachusetts

Coordinates: 42.1576°N 71.3351°W

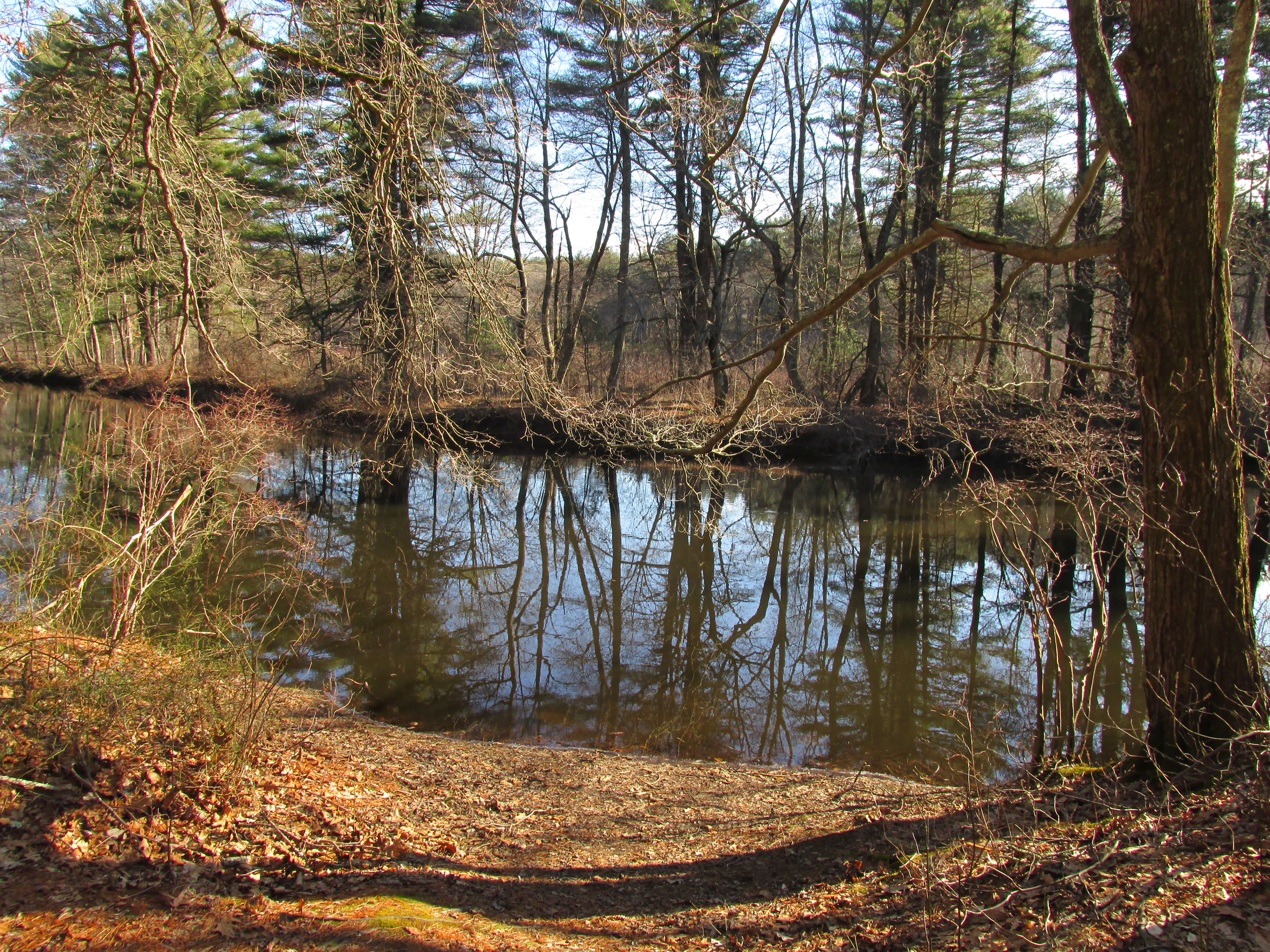
- Charles River
- Interactive map of Cedariver
- Established: 2004
- Operator: The Trustees of Reservations
- Website: Cedariver

Cedariver, formerly known as The Baker Reservation, is a 55-acre (22 ha) open space reserve located on the Charles River in Millis, Massachusetts. The property, acquired in 2004 by the land conservation non-profit organization The Trustees of Reservations, includes farm fields, woodlots, and 1-mile (1.6 km) of river frontage.

Cedariver is open to hiking, picnicking, car-top boating, cross country skiing, and other passive pursuits. A trailhead is located on Forest Road in Millis. The property was a 2004 gift of the family of Polly Baker.
