= Bear's Den =

Nature reserve in New Salem, Massachusetts, USA

Coordinates: 42°32′31″N 72°19′34″W

- Bear's Den Falls
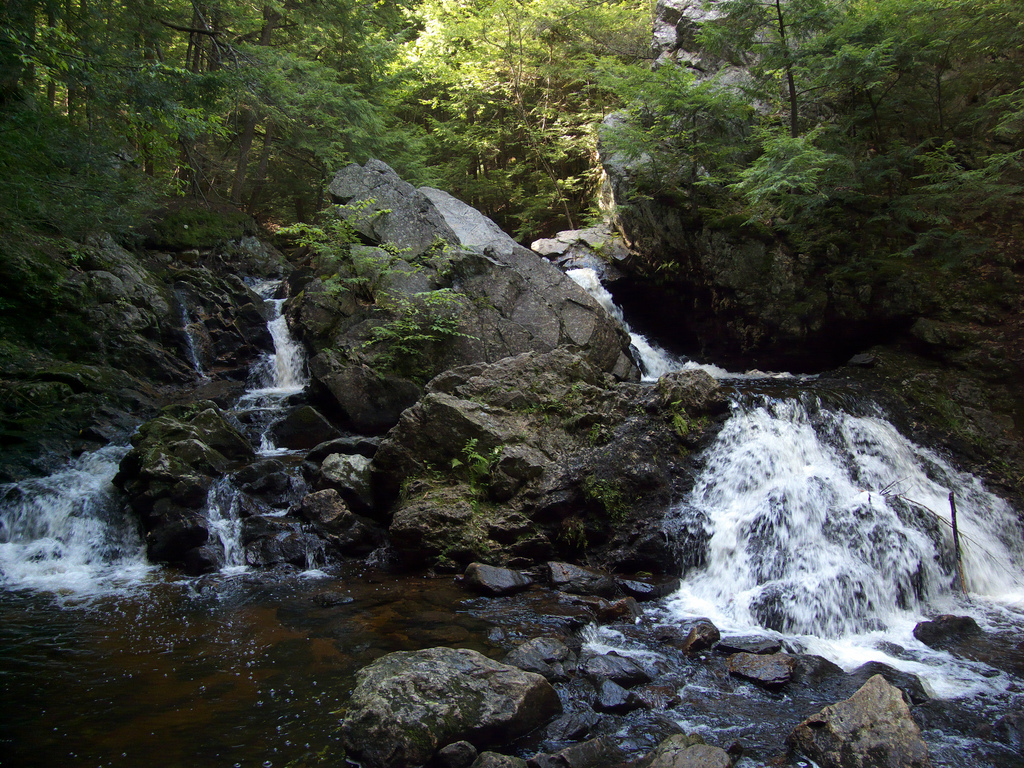
- Bears Den Falls
- Interactive map of Bear's Den
- Location: New Salem, Massachusetts
- Area: 6 acres (2.4 ha)
- Owner: Trustees of Reservations

Bear's Den (also called by the name of its most outstanding landmark, Bear's Den Falls) is a 6-acre (24,000 m^{2}) nature reserve in New Salem, Massachusetts. The reservation is close to the Quabbin Reservoir and is owned by the Trustees of Reservations.

== Name ==
The property takes its name from a large black bear once shot here "though more romantic – yet unsubstantiated – stories exist" according to the Trustees of Reservations.

== Description ==
The Middle Branch of the Swift River passes through the steep granite cliffs of Bear's Den reservation on its way to the Quabbin Reservoir. The gorge is 75' deep and rimmed with hemlock. At one point, a change in elevation creates a waterfall. According to one description:

So as you walk the 150 yard path from the road and bear left through the jagged opening in the ridge, you have a limited sense of the waterfall being there until you step through and into this amphitheater of Mother Nature. Once inside, you sense an isolation from the rest of the world. It's a great experience and unique for a location so close to the road.

A short path leads from Neilson Road into the reservation and immediately splits into a leftward path towards the gorge and a rightward path leading to a small cave (the eponymous "Bear's Den") and a stream. These trail is less than one quarter mile of easy hiking. The reservation is "a tranquil spot for hiking and picnicking." Seasonal hunting is allowed on the property subject to all state and local laws.

Camping, fires, and unleashed dogs are prohibited. Swimming is discouraged. Bear's Den reservation is open from dusk until dawn. The property abuts watershed land and wetlands to the west connecting to the Quabbin Reservoir and owned by the Massachusetts Water Resources Authority.

== History ==
Metacomet, sachem of the Wampanoag Indians and their war chief during King Philip's War, is believed to have met here with neighboring other Nipmuck chieftains in 1675 to plan attacks the nearby English towns of Deerfield, Hadley and Northampton ( see note). Much later, the falls provided waterpower for grist mills in the area as water was carried by a sluice box, through a channel cut in the eastern cliff, and onto an overshot water wheel. Trustees of Reservations first acquired the property through the 1968 bequest of Mrs. Grais Poole Burrage. In 1988, Mrs. Dorothy Fittz donated additional land.
