= Dry Hill, West Virginia =

Unincorporated community in West Virginia, United States

Dry Hill
- Unincorporated community
- Location within the state of West Virginia Dry Hill (the United States)
- Coordinates: 37°48′54″N 81°13′11″W
- Country: United States
- State: West Virginia
- County: Raleigh
- Elevation: 2,470 ft (750 m)
- Time zone: UTC-5 (Eastern (EST))
  - Summer (DST): UTC-4 (EDT)
- GNIS ID: 1554330

Dry Hill is an unincorporated community in Raleigh County, West Virginia.
