= Chase Woodlands =

Nature reserve in Dover, Massachusetts, US

Coordinates: 42°14′2″N 71°19′22″W

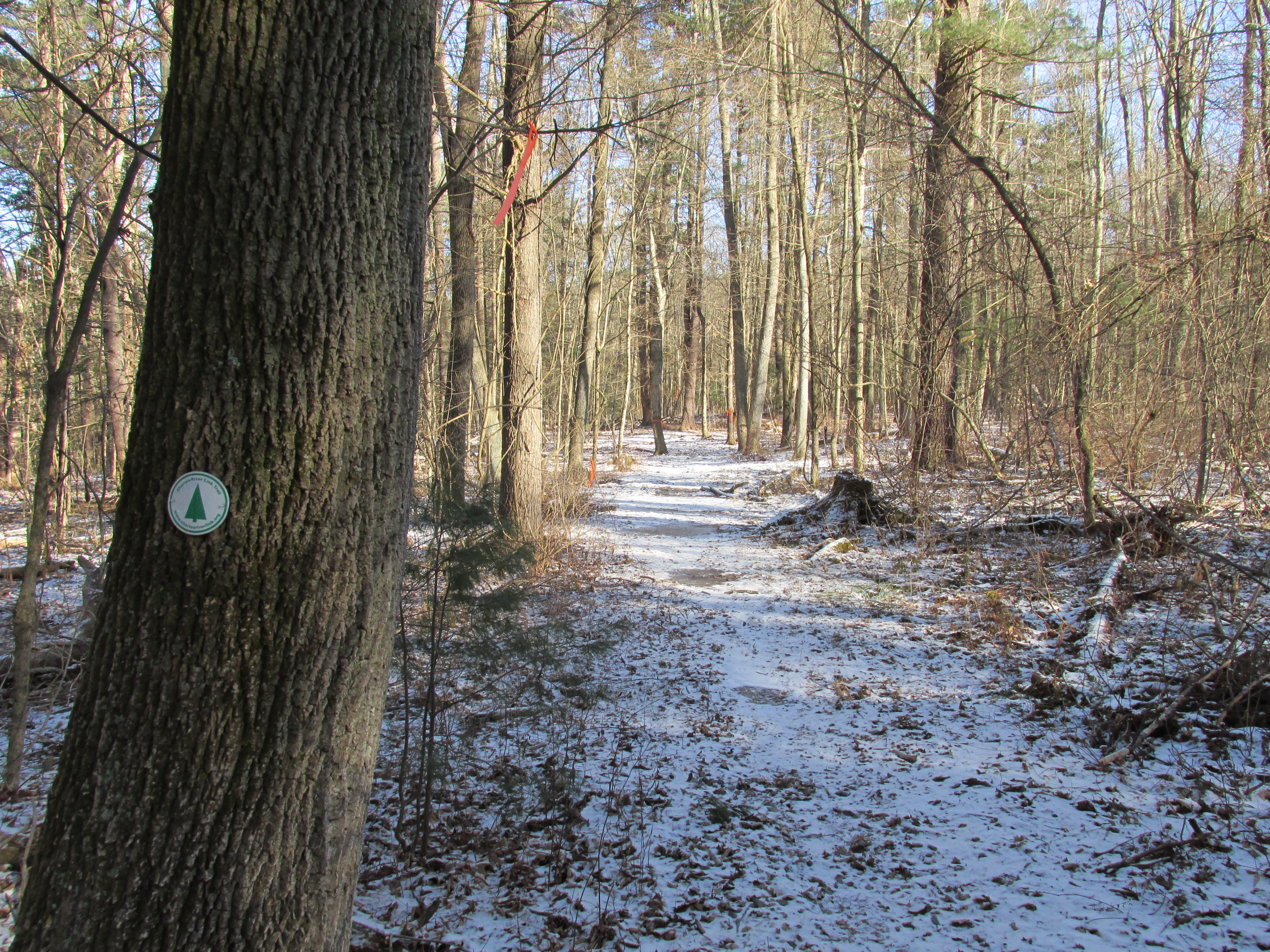
Charles River Link Trail

Chase Woodlands is a nature reserve located in Dover, Massachusetts. The property was acquired by The Trustees of Reservations in 1993. The reservation includes 2.5 miles of trails and is located across Farm Street from the Peters Reservation. The Charles River Link Trail crosses both reservations.
