= Weir River Farm =

Nature reserve in Hingham, Massachusetts

Coordinates: 42°14′24″N 70°51′13″W

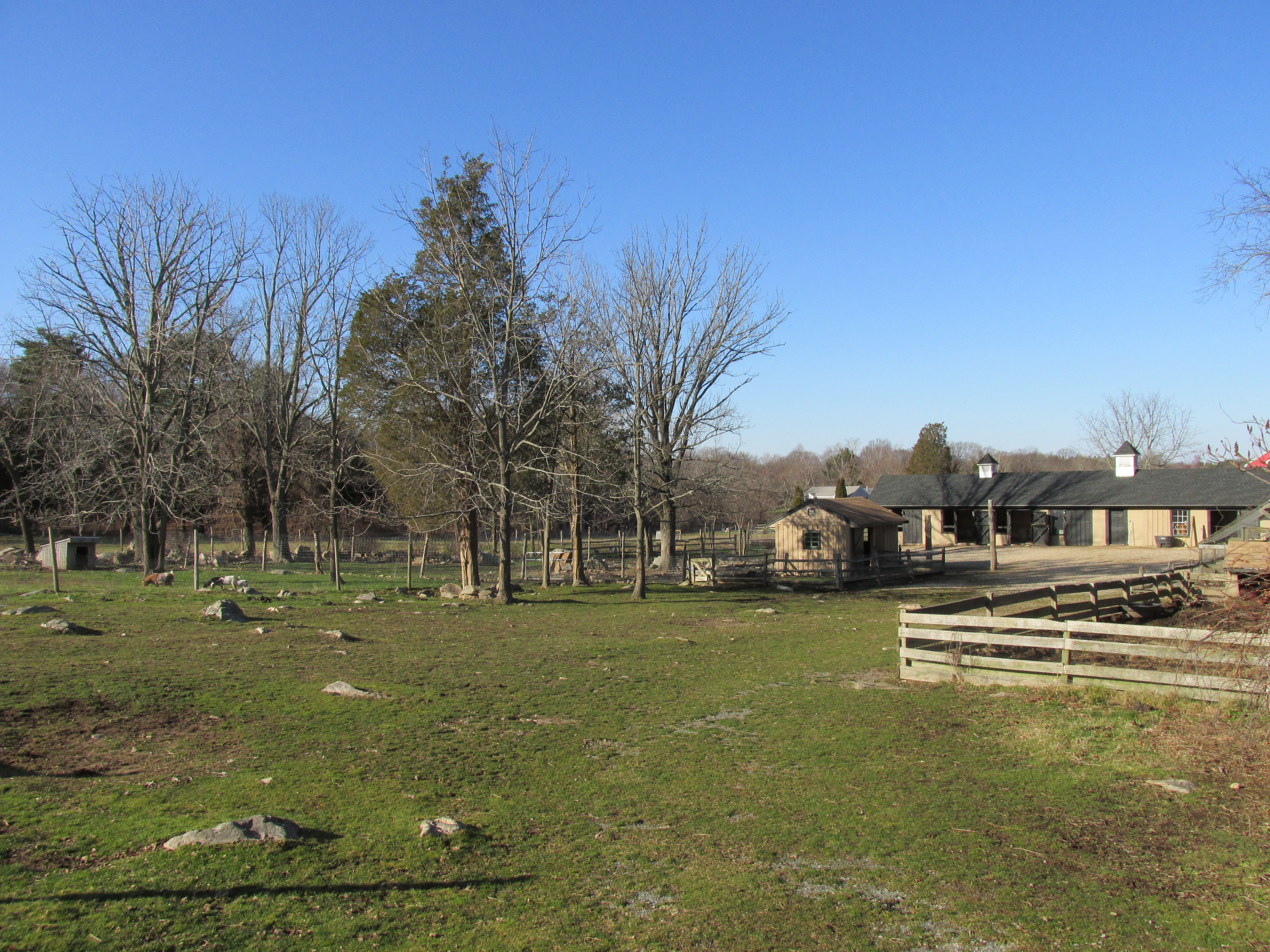
Weir River Farm

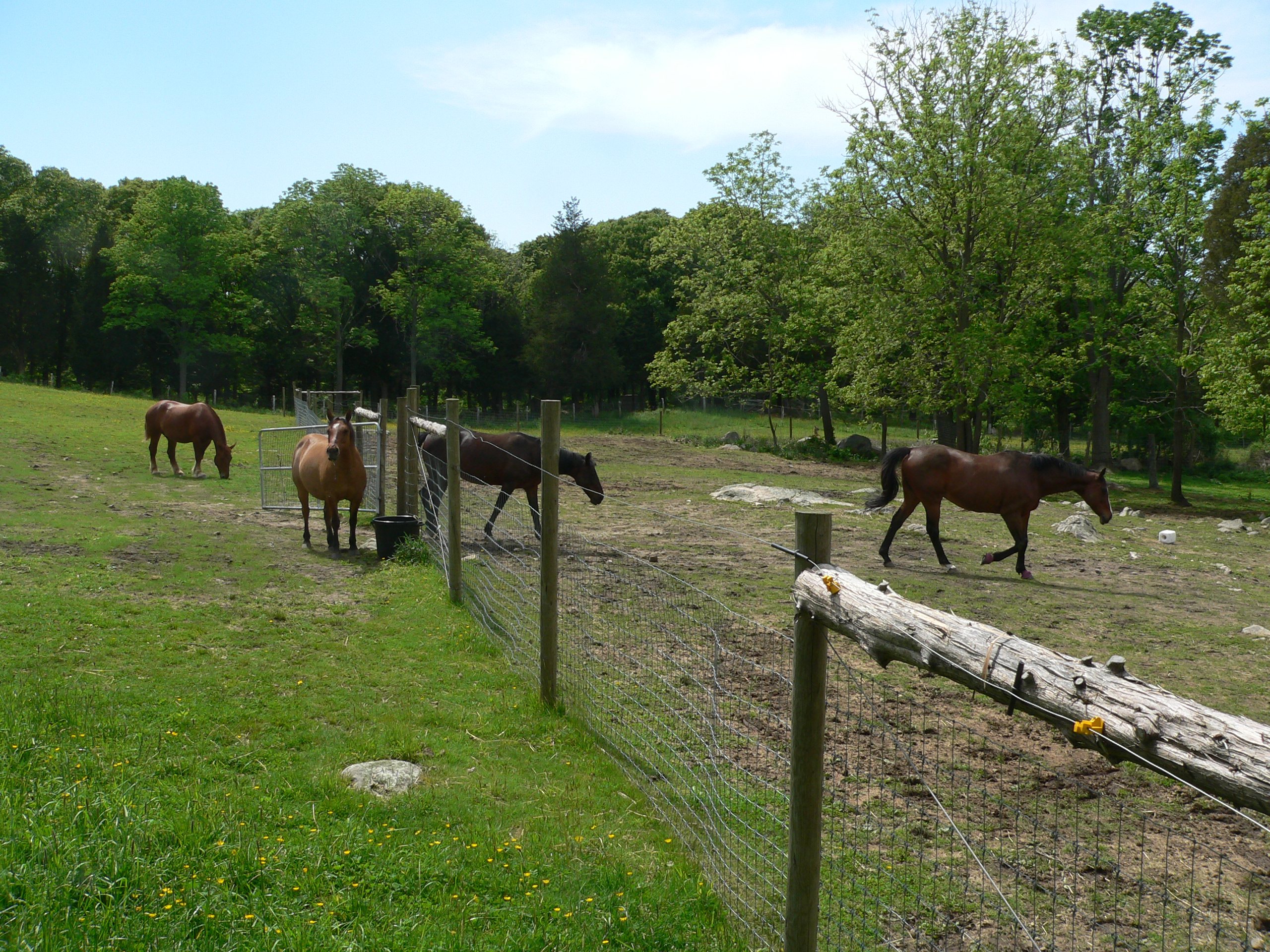

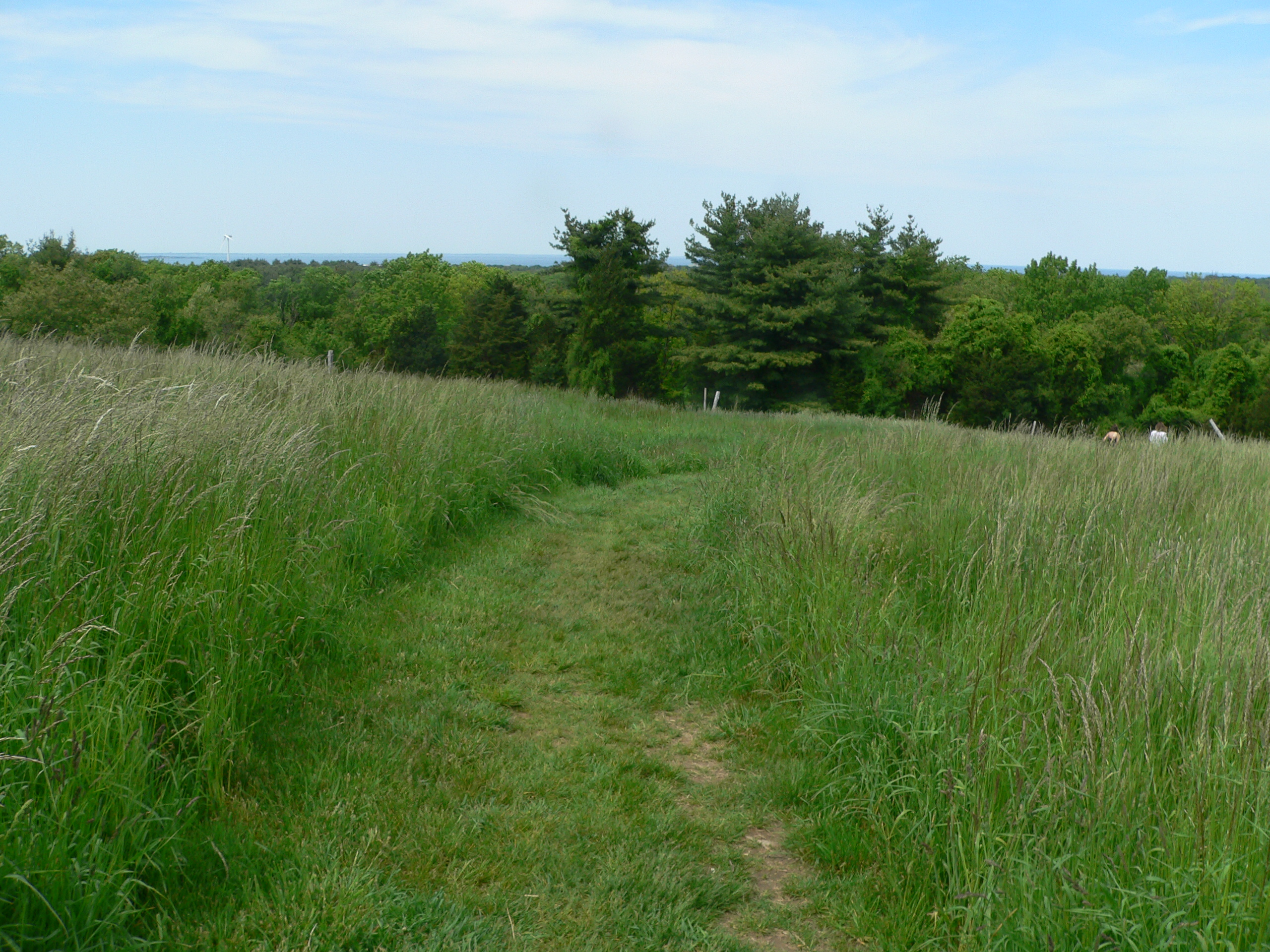

Weir River Farm is a nature reserve located in Hingham, Massachusetts. The property is owned by The Trustees of Reservations. It is located adjacent to the Trustees-owned Whitney and Thayer Woods reservation, and the town-owned Turkey Hill property, which the Trustees manage.

== History ==
Weir River Farm was the former home of painter Polly Thayer Starr, who gave it to The Trustees of Reservations in 1999.

From June 12, 2021, through June 1, 2022, the farm is the site of a special exhibit entitled "Polly Thayer Starr: Spirit of Discovery". The exhibit is intended to "provide visitors of all ages the opportunity to use imagination and observation to explore nature and celebrate the artist’s remarkable 75-year artistic legacy."
