= Charles River Peninsula =

Nature preserve in Needham, Massachusetts, U.S.

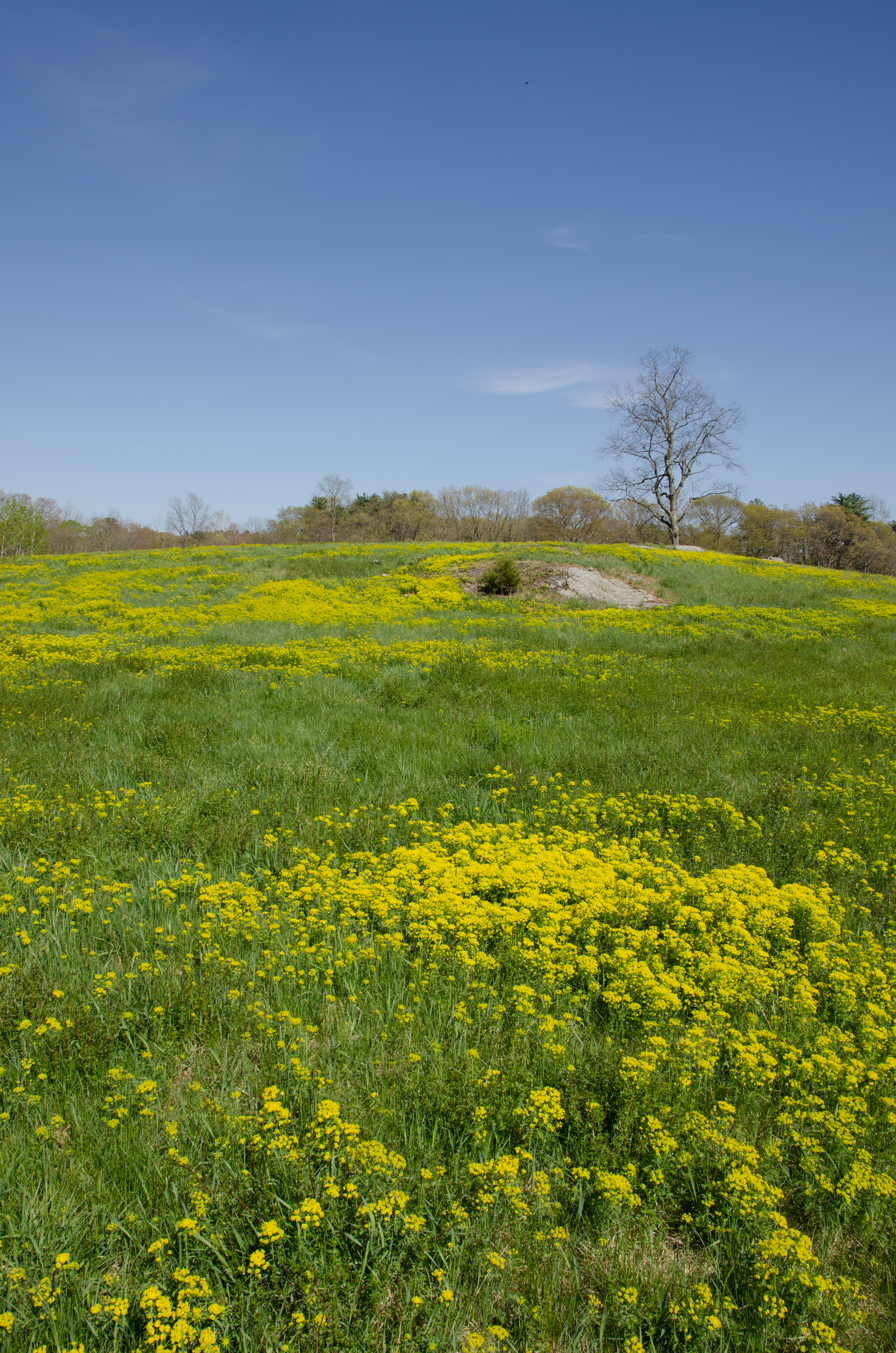
- The peninsula in April, looking inland.
- Interactive map of Charles River Peninsula
- Location: Needham, Massachusetts, U.S.
- Coordinates: 42°15′23″N 71°16′0″W
- Area: 30 acres (12 ha)
- Owner: Trustees of Reservations
- Website: Charles River Peninsula

The Charles River Peninsula is a 30-acre (12 ha) nature preserve in Needham, Massachusetts owned and managed by the Trustees of Reservations. The Charles River turns nearly 180 degrees, creating the peninsula. A 20-acre (8 ha) field on the peninsula was farmed for roughly a century. The original acreage was given in 1960; additional land was given in 1994.

The property includes a loop hiking trail and a boat launch.

== Gallery ==
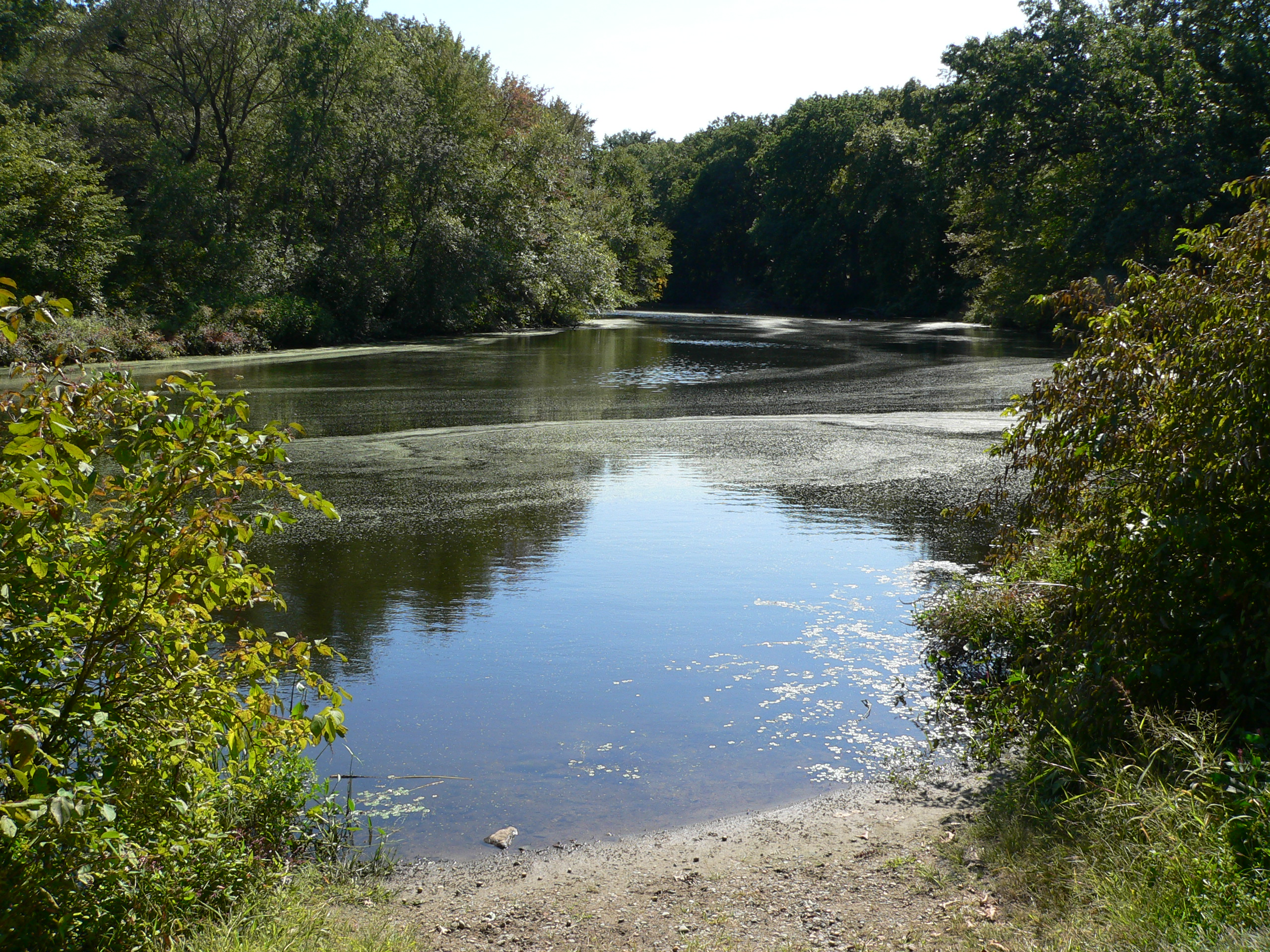
View of the river

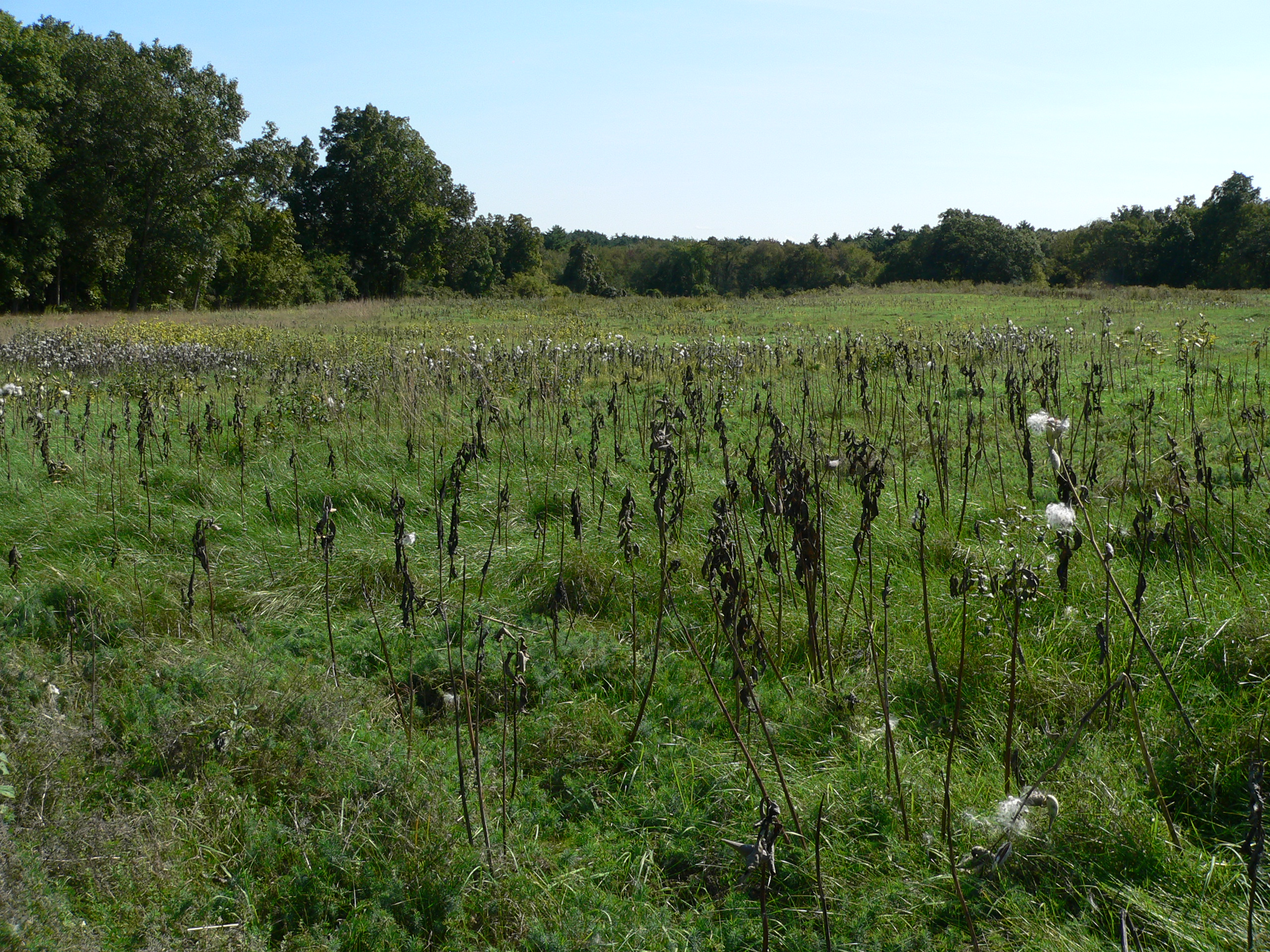
Field of milkweed in the fall
