= Chapel Brook =

Stream in Franklin County, Massachusetts, US

Coordinates: 42°28′57″N 72°45′36″W

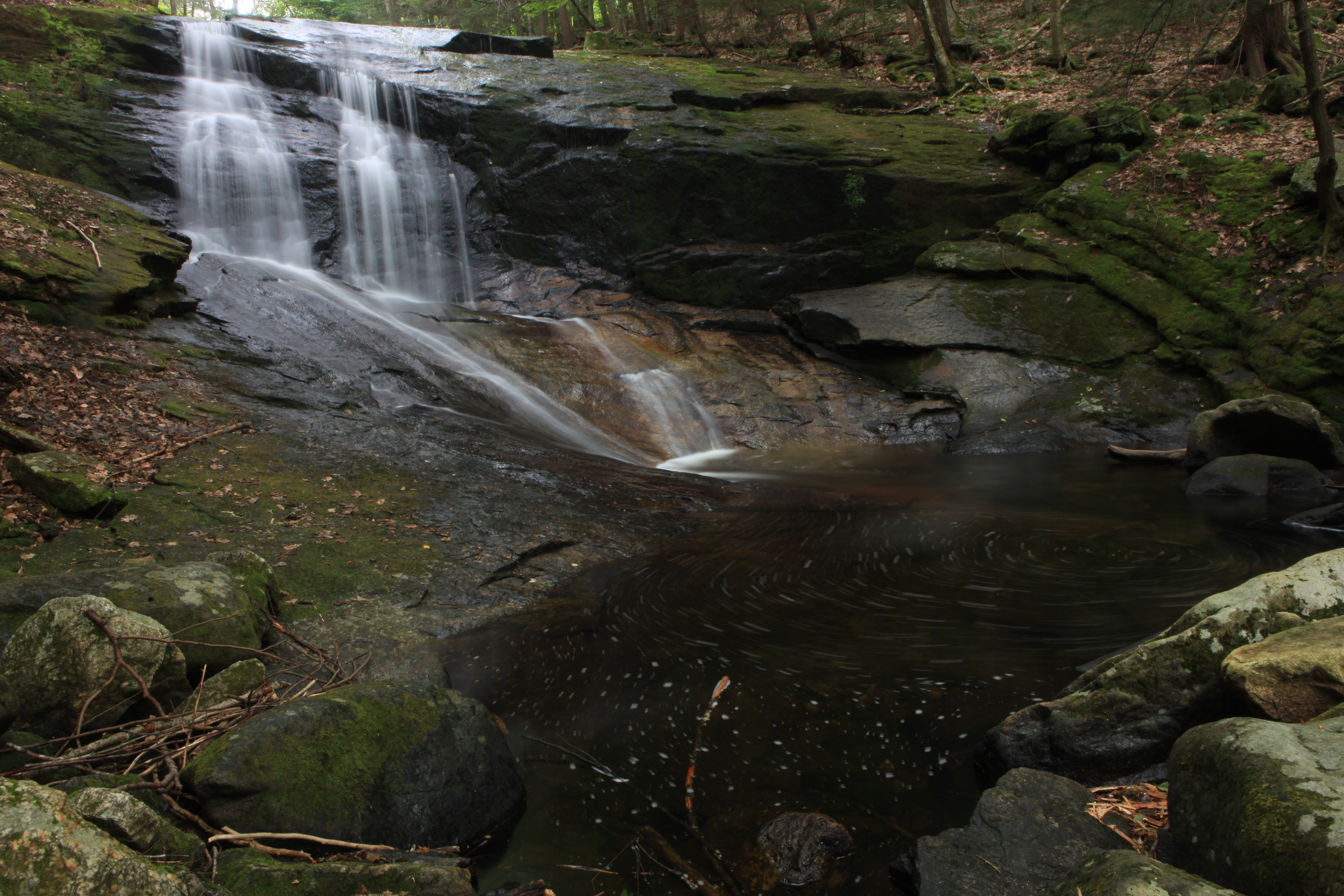
- Interactive map of Chapel Brook
- Established: 1964
- Operator: The Trustees of Reservations
- Website: Chapel Brook

Chapel Brook
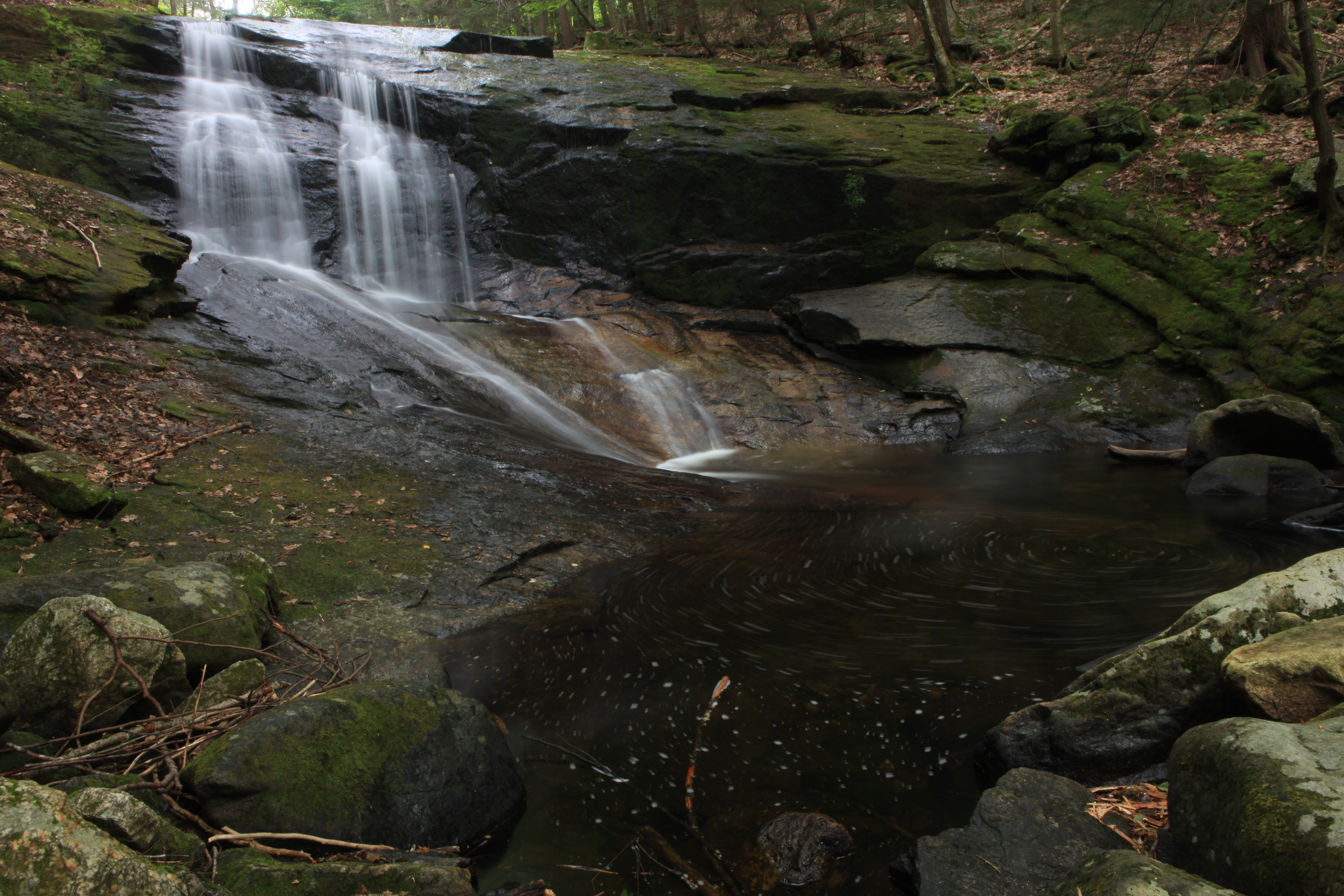

Physical characteristics
- Source
  - location: Ashfield, Massachusetts
- Mouth
  - location: Conway, Massachusetts
- Length: 3.79 mi (6.10 km)

Chapel Brook of Franklin County, Massachusetts, is a tributary of the South River (of the Deerfield River watershed) and the name of a 173-acre (70 ha) open space preserve located along the brook. The brook, est. 3.79 mi (6.10 km) long, is located in southeast Ashfield and southwest Conway. It drains into Poland Brook, thence into the South River, the Deerfield River, the Connecticut River, and Long Island Sound. The Chapel Brook reservation, managed by the non-profit conservation organization The Trustees of Reservations, is located in Ashfield and contains Chapel Falls, a series of three waterfalls on Chapel Brook, measuring 10 feet (3.0 m), 15 feet (4.6 m) and 20 feet (6.1 m) high; and Pony Mountain (also called Chapel Ledge) est. 1,400 feet (430 m), a 100-foot (30 m) open granite cliff face and popular recreational rock climbing site.

== History ==
After Ashfield was incorporated in 1765, colonial settlers moved into the region and cleared the forest for pasture. By 1831, the area around Pony Mountain contained the larger part of a herd of 8,000 sheep. At the same time, Chapel Falls became the site of at least two gristmills and a two-room schoolhouse. The school "doubled as a Methodist chapel on Sundays, when the folding doors separating the two rooms were swung open."

The original acreage of the Chapel Brook reservation was donated by Mrs. Henry T. Curtiss in 1964 in memory of her husband and expanded with purchases derived from Curtiss' endowment in 1981 and 1989. Additional acreage was donated in 1992.

== Recreation ==
The Chapel Brook reservation is open to hiking, mountain biking, picnicking, fishing, rock climbing, and wading in the pools below the falls. Chapel Falls are accessed via a short footpath. A 1 mile (1.6 km) trail ascends to the open ledges of Pony Mountain where there are scenic vistas of the surrounding woodlands. A 2-mile (3.2 km) forest trail, managed by the local trail-building organization Ashfield Trails, leads from the base of Pony Cliffs to West Road in Ashfield. You can cross West Rd and the trail continues up into the Daughters of American Revolution State Forest (DAR SF). Trailheads to the property are located along Williamsburg Road in South Ashfield.
