= Lucy Stone Home Site =

- U.S. National Register of Historic Places
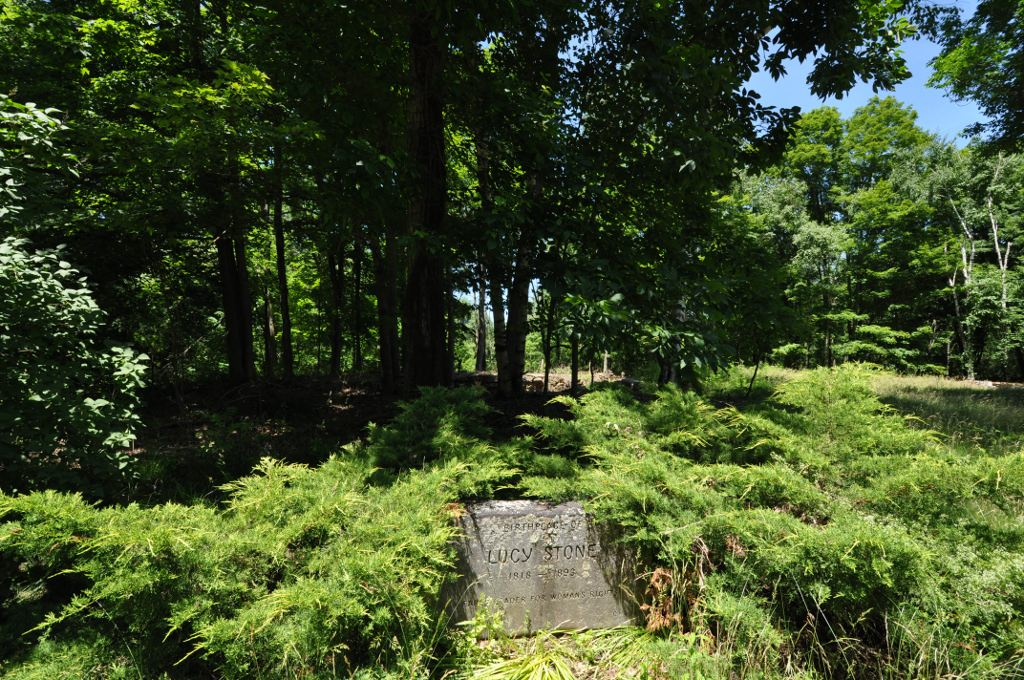

- Location within Massachusetts Location within the United States
- Location: 69 Coy Hill Rd., West Brookfield, Massachusetts
- Coordinates: 42°15′23″N 72°11′32″W
- NRHP reference No.: 100006122
- Added to NRHP: February 8, 2021

The Lucy Stone Home Site is a historic archeological site on Coy Hill Road in West Brookfield, Massachusetts. The site is owned and managed by The Trustees of Reservations, a non-profit land conservation and historic preservation organization, and is located within the Trustees' Rock House Reservation. The home site includes 61 acres (25 ha) of forested land on the side of Coys Hill west of West Brookfield village. Although the farmhouse in which Lucy Stone (1818-1893) was born and married burned to the ground in 1950, its ruins are at the center of the property. The site has long been a memorial to Stone, an early and prominent activist for women's rights.

The site was listed on the National Register of Historic Places in 2021.

== See also ==
- National Register of Historic Places listings in Worcester County, Massachusetts
- Rock House Reservation
