= Whitney and Thayer Woods =

Nature reserve and forest in Massachusetts, United States

Coordinates: 42°13′54″N 70°50′23″W

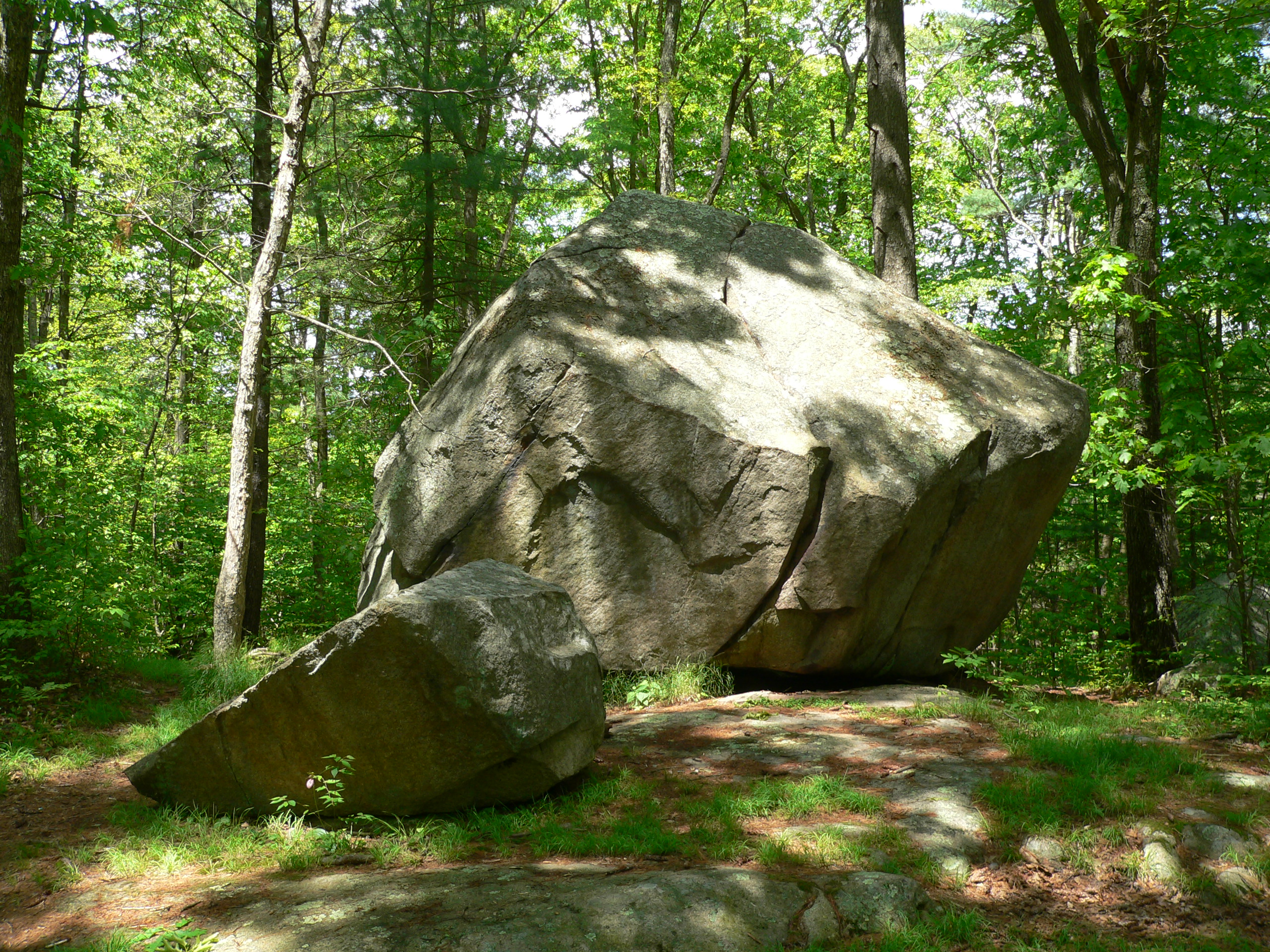
glacial erratic

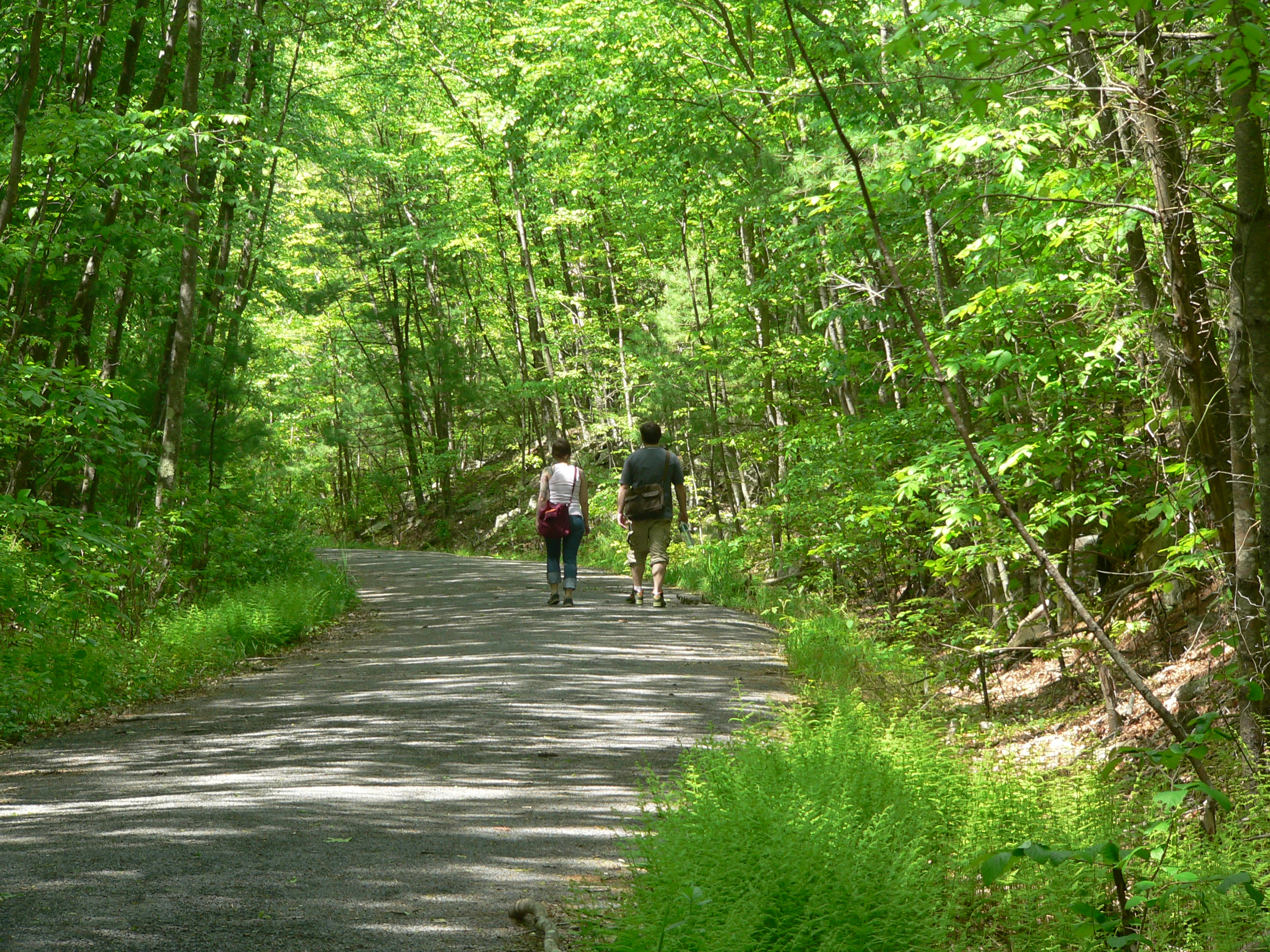

Whitney and Thayer Woods is a 834 acres (338 ha) nature reserve and forest located in Cohasset and Hingham, Massachusetts. The property is owned by The Trustees of Reservations. It is adjacent to the Weir River Farm, also owned by The Trustees, and Turkey Hill, a town-owned property managed by The Trustees. The woods include 10 miles (16 km) of walking trails.

== History ==
In the 17th century, the “Common Lands of the Hingham Planters” was divided into long strips for logging and farming.
