= Bridge Island Meadows =

Nature reserve in Massachusetts, United States

Coordinates: 42°11′39″N 71°20′52″W

Bridge Island Meadows is an 80-acre (320,000 m^{2}) nature reserve owned by The Trustees of Reservations on the floodplains of the upper Charles River in Millis, Massachusetts. The property was a 1974 gift from Dr. and Mrs. John D. Constable to the Trustees of Reservations. The property is surrounded by wetlands, and is only accessible by boat.

== Description ==
This wooded upland rises to the east above the floodplains of the Charles River where the intermittent waters of Bogastow Brook enter South End Pond. Lower terrain around this point is wetland, making access to Bridge Island Meadows extremely difficult.

Because it is surrounded by wetlands and is accessible only by boat, Bridge Island Meadows is a "private favorite of intrepid paddlers." The town of Millis offers three canoe launch points into the Charles River near this 80-acre (320,000 m^{2}) greenspace. One can approach the property by paddling a kayak or other small, maneuverable boat up the Charles River and turning west near the Medfield State Hospital up a small stream that leads to South End Pond. The passage to South End Pond through Bogastow Brook is even more challenging as it is a small, intermittent tributary that is thick with vegetation.

Boat landing is made very difficult by the grasses and other plants that grow tall and thick but, according to the Trustees of Reservations, a "successful journey is rewarded by bushwhacking to a 130-foot tree-covered knoll at the south end of the Reservation offering glimpses of the surrounding floodplain." This isolated place is also of interest to birdwatchers.

The reservation is "open" all year, sunrise to sundown.

== Upper Charles River Valley ==
The Trustees of Reservations protection on Bridge Island Meadows in its untamed state is a part of a collaborative effort between municipalities, non-profit organizations, and individuals committed to the "protection of the natural beauty and environmental value of the Upper Charles River Valley" From its source in Hopkinton, Massachusetts until it flows into Boston Harbor, the eighty-five mile long waterway is "one of the most beautiful and accessible of America's urban rivers."
