= Dryhill =

Village in United Kingdom

Coordinates: 51.2748°N 0.1430°E

Dryhill is a small hamlet in the Sevenoaks district, in the county of Kent, England.

== Location ==
It is about two miles away from the large town of Sevenoaks, located near the A25 road between Sevenoaks and Sundridge.

== Transport ==
For transport there is the Sevenoaks railway station and the A25 road, the M25 motorway, M20 motorway and the M26 motorway nearby.

== Local Nature Reserve ==
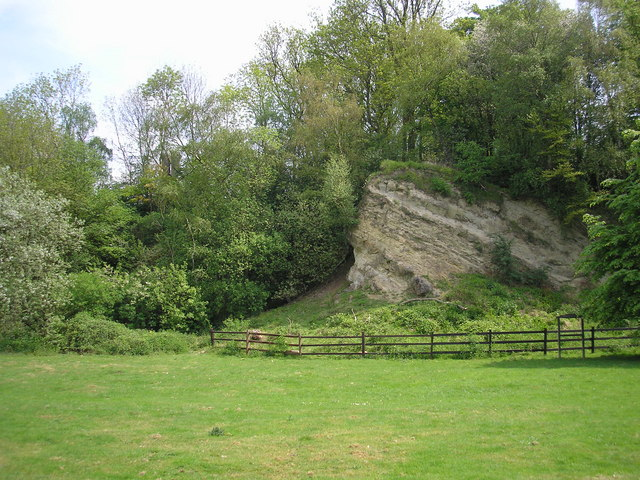
Natural Ragstone Outcrop in Dryhill Nature Reserve

The Dryhill Local Nature Reserve based on an old ragstone quarry at the edge of the village covers some 20 hectares (50 acres (200,000 m^{2}) ). The quarry is also a Geological interest listed Site of Special Scientific Interest.

It is no longer managed by Kent County Council, but remains open as a Country Park and picnic area.
