= Long Point Wildlife Refuge =

Wildlife refuge in West Tisbury, Massachusetts, US

Coordinates: 41°21′38″N 70°38′0″W

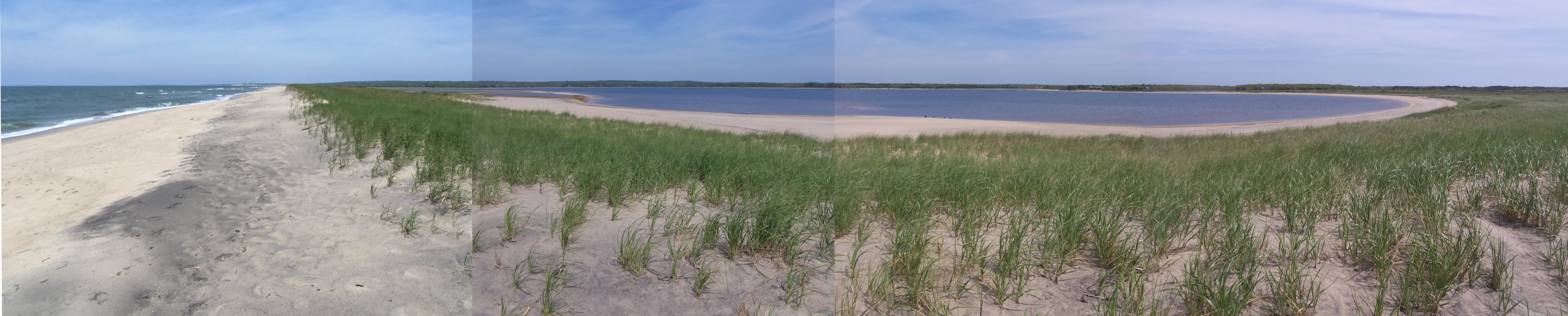
Panorama including Tisbury Great Pond (June 2021)

Long Point Wildlife Refuge is a wildlife refuge and nature reserve located in West Tisbury, Massachusetts. The property is owned by The Trustees of Reservations; it has grown in size since its first purchase in 1979.

== Activities ==
Canoe and kayak rentals are available in July and August.

== Advance ticketing ==
In March 2020, the refuge was closed to the public because of the COVID-19 pandemic. In June 2020, the refuge reopened, but visitors were required to purchase tickets in advance online. The advance ticketing requirement remained in place for summer 2021.
