= Noon Hill and Shattuck Reservation =

Massachusetts open space preserves

Coordinates: 42°09′53.2″N 71°19′06.6″W

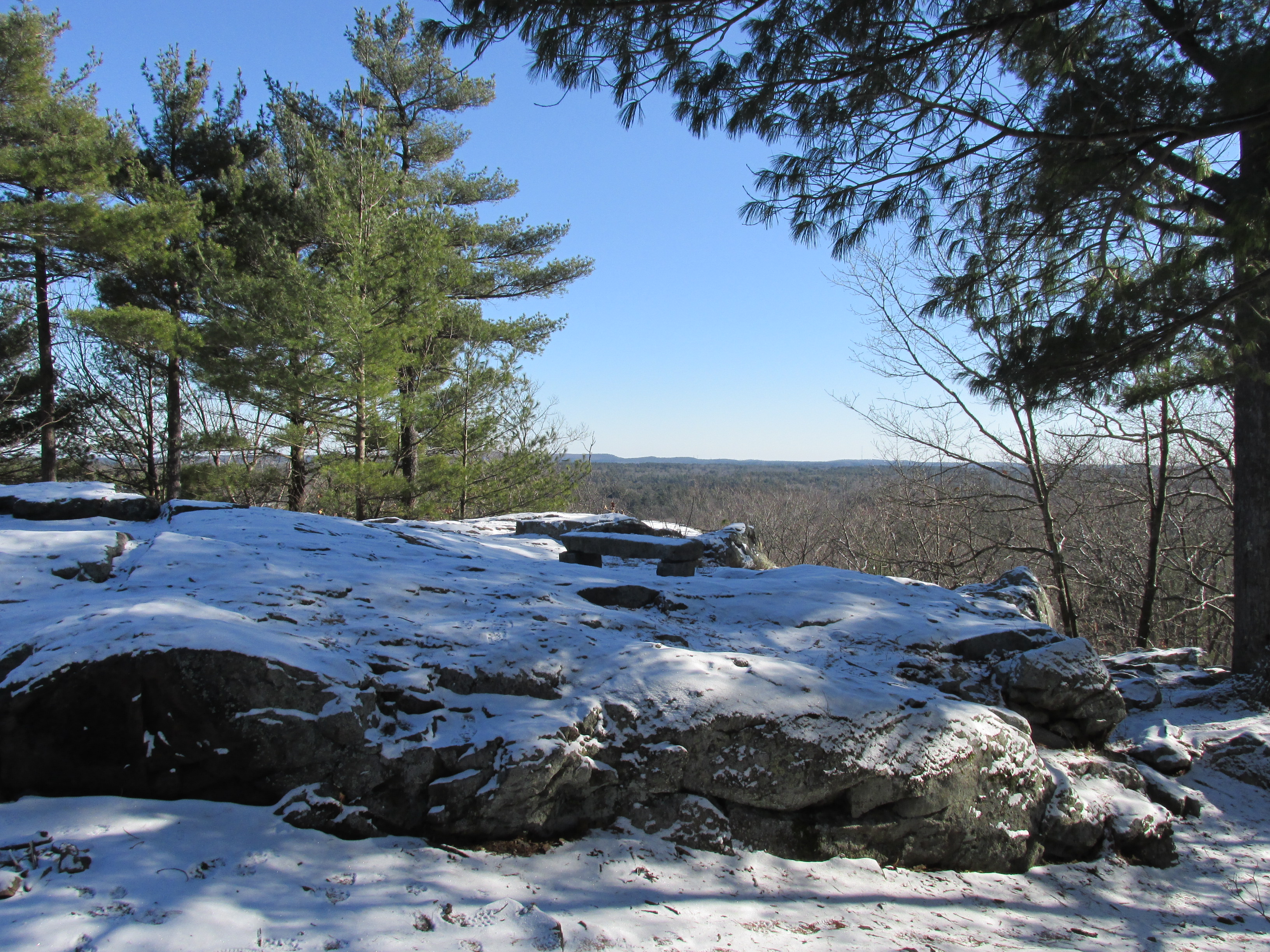
- Noon Hill
- Interactive map of Noon Hill and Shattuck Reservation
- Location: Noon Hill Road; Medfield, Massachusetts, USA
- Area: 449 acres (182 ha) combined
- Established: 1959 and 1970
- Operator: The Trustees of Reservations
- Website: Noon Hill and Shattuck

Noon Hill and Shattuck Reservation are adjacent open space preserves located in Medfield, Massachusetts. They are managed by the land conservation non-profit organization The Trustees of Reservations. The 200-mile (320 km) Bay Circuit Trail passes through both properties. The Town of Medfield owns conservation land adjacent to the properties.

Noon Hill is a 204-acre (83 ha) open space preserve that offers 4.5 miles (7.2 km) of trails available for hiking, horseback riding, mountain biking, and cross country skiing. Oak-hickory forest, wetlands, vernal pools, steep ravines, boulders, and rocky ledges characterize the preserve. The preserve is centered on 370-foot (110 m) Noon Hill, a prominent summit and scenic vista. Holt Pond, a constructed mill pond, is located on the property.

Shattuck Reservation is a 245-acre (99 ha) preserve along the Charles River. It consists of "a forested upland neck of oak and pine overlooking a wet meadow and red maple swamp." Stone walls demonstrate that the land was once used as pasture.

== History ==
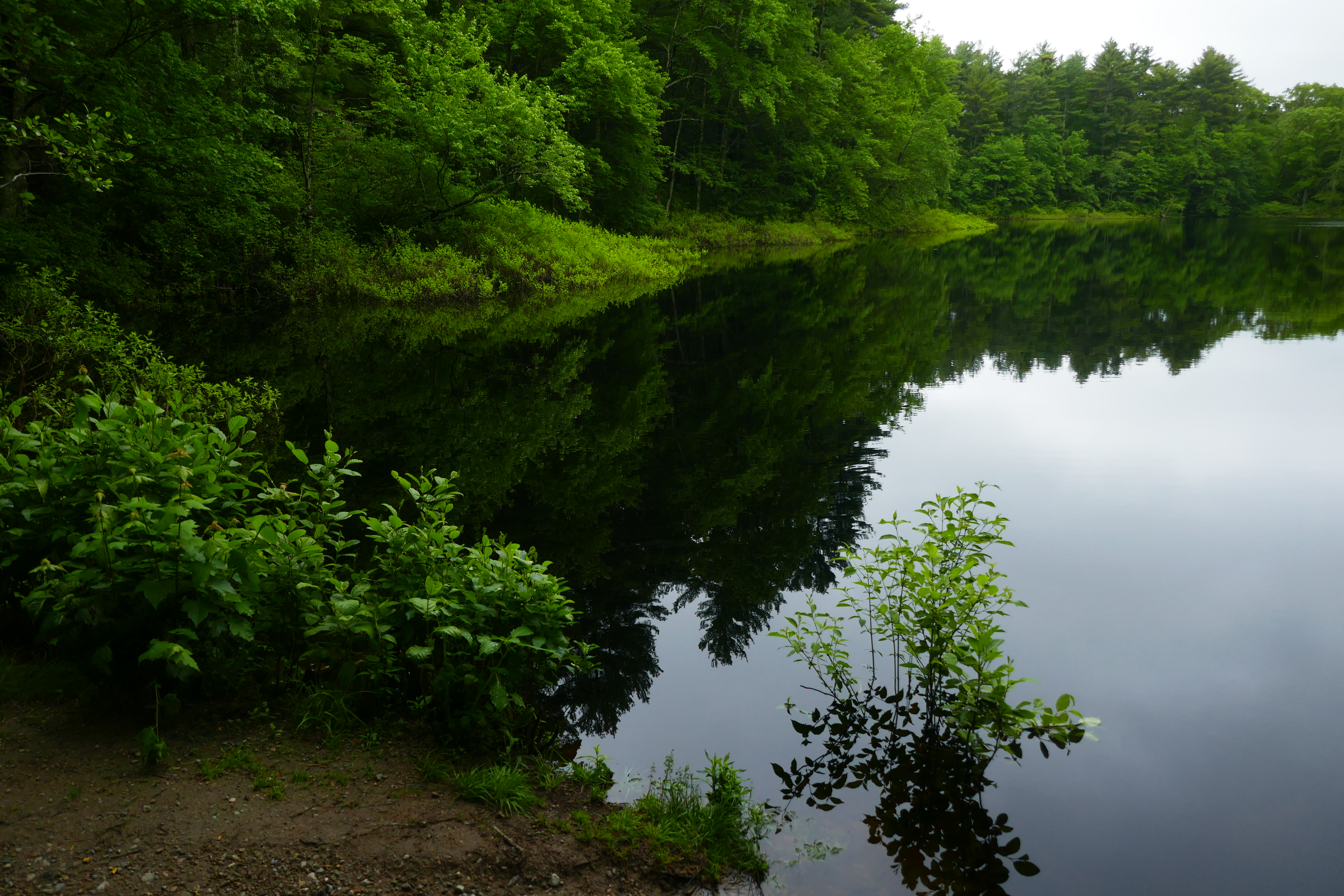
Holt Pond

The rugged, rocky terrain of Noon Hill was formed via glacial action during the last ice age through glacial plucking and scouring. Holt Pond, the dammed flow of Sawmill Brook, was constructed circa 1764 to service colonial era mills. Other parts of the property were used as pasture land.

Noon Hill was acquired in 1959 as a gift of W. K. Gilmore & Sons; additional land was given by other donors in 1960, 1963, and 1978.

Dwight's Causeway, at the northern end of Shattuck, was the site of a bridge that washed out in the 1938 New England hurricane. The Trustees acquired Shattuck in 1970.

== Recreation ==
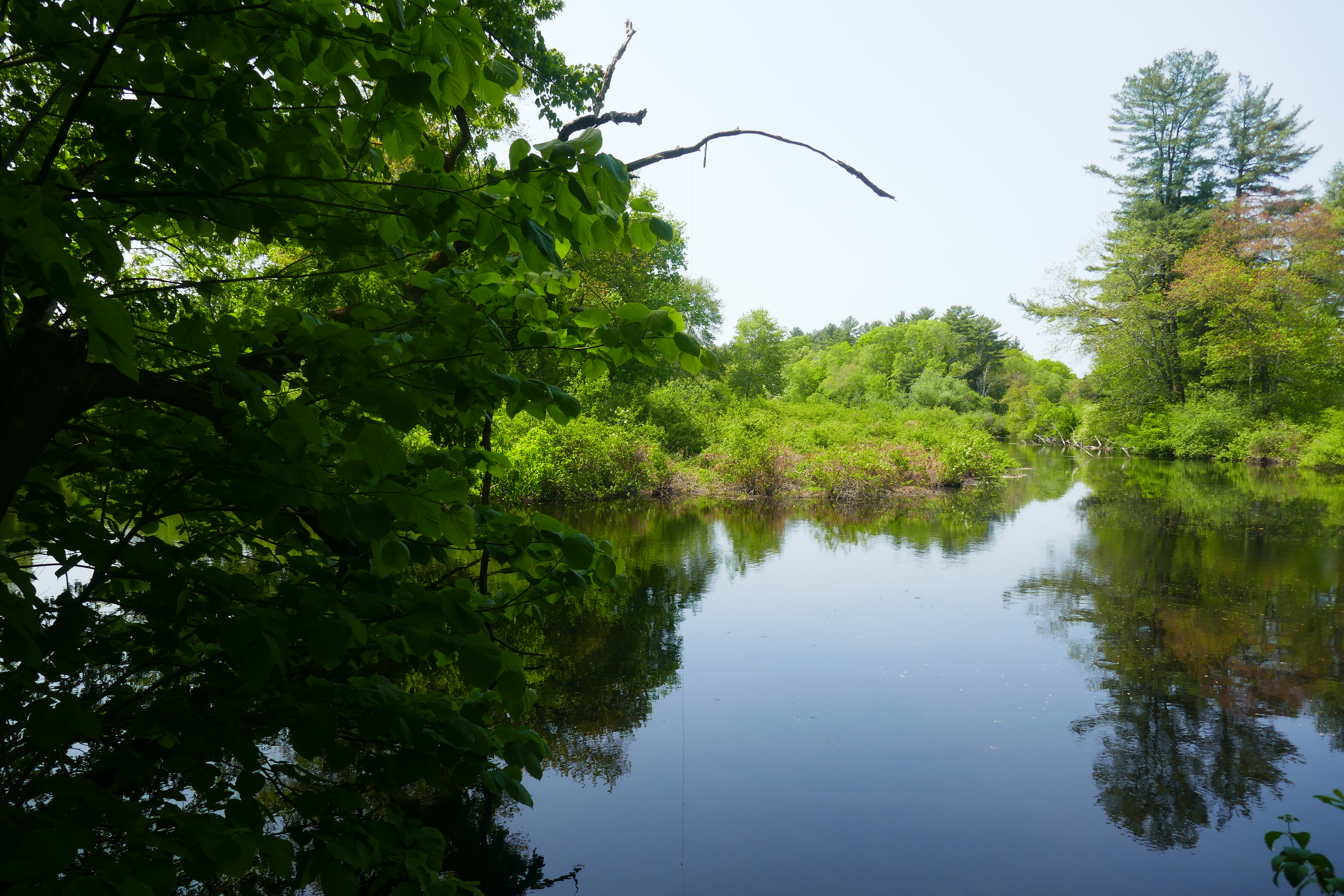
Shattuck Reservation

The main trailhead and parking lot for both properties is located on Noon Hill Road in Medfield. The properties may be reached on foot via the Bay Circuit Trail, a long-distance hiking trail that forms a 200-mile (320 km) arc around the suburban belt to the west of Boston. A canoe landing in the Shattuck Reservation allows visitors to arrive by boat.

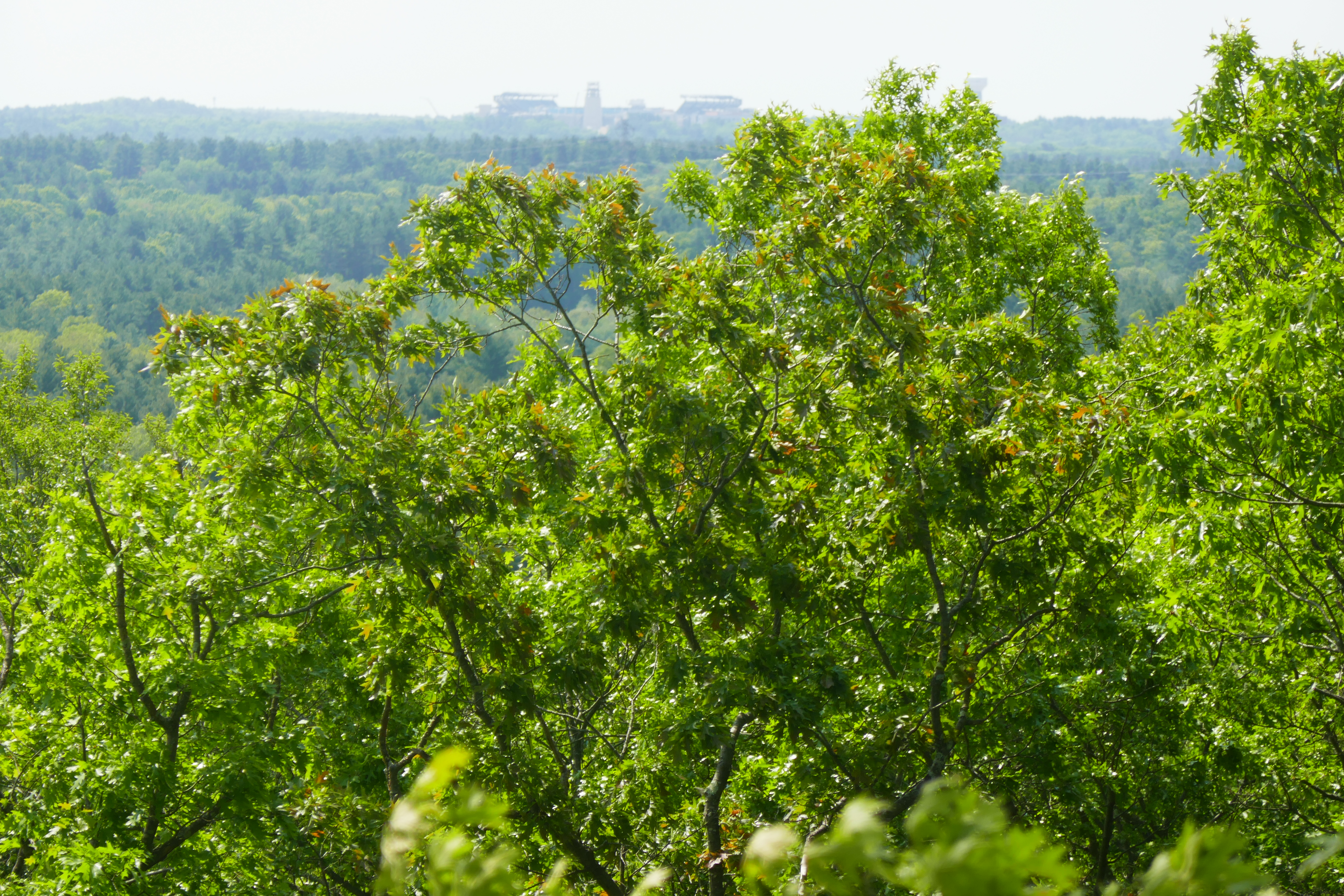
Distant view of Gillette Stadium from Noon Hill

A network of trails span the properties. Within the Noon Hill reservation, the Bay Circuit Trail passes over the summit of Noon Hill, where open ledges offer views of the landscape of neighboring Walpole, Norfolk, and Great Blue Hill. A new segment of the Bay Circuit Trail was created within the Shattuck Reservation in 2012 to reduce the distance that the trail followed Causeway Street.

== Advisories ==
"Authorized seasonal bow hunting" is allowed in the fall at both properties. Shooting ranges are located across the road from Noon Hill, and across the Charles River from Shattuck. According to the Trustees website, noise from the shooting ranges "can be very loud at times."

Off-leash dogs are permitted at Shattuck only and as long as they are under control at all times. Dogs must be on leash at Noon Hill at all times. Mountain biking on official trails, is permitted.
