= Dry Hill =

Nature preserve in Massachusetts, US

Coordinates: 42°8′5″N 73°13′36″W

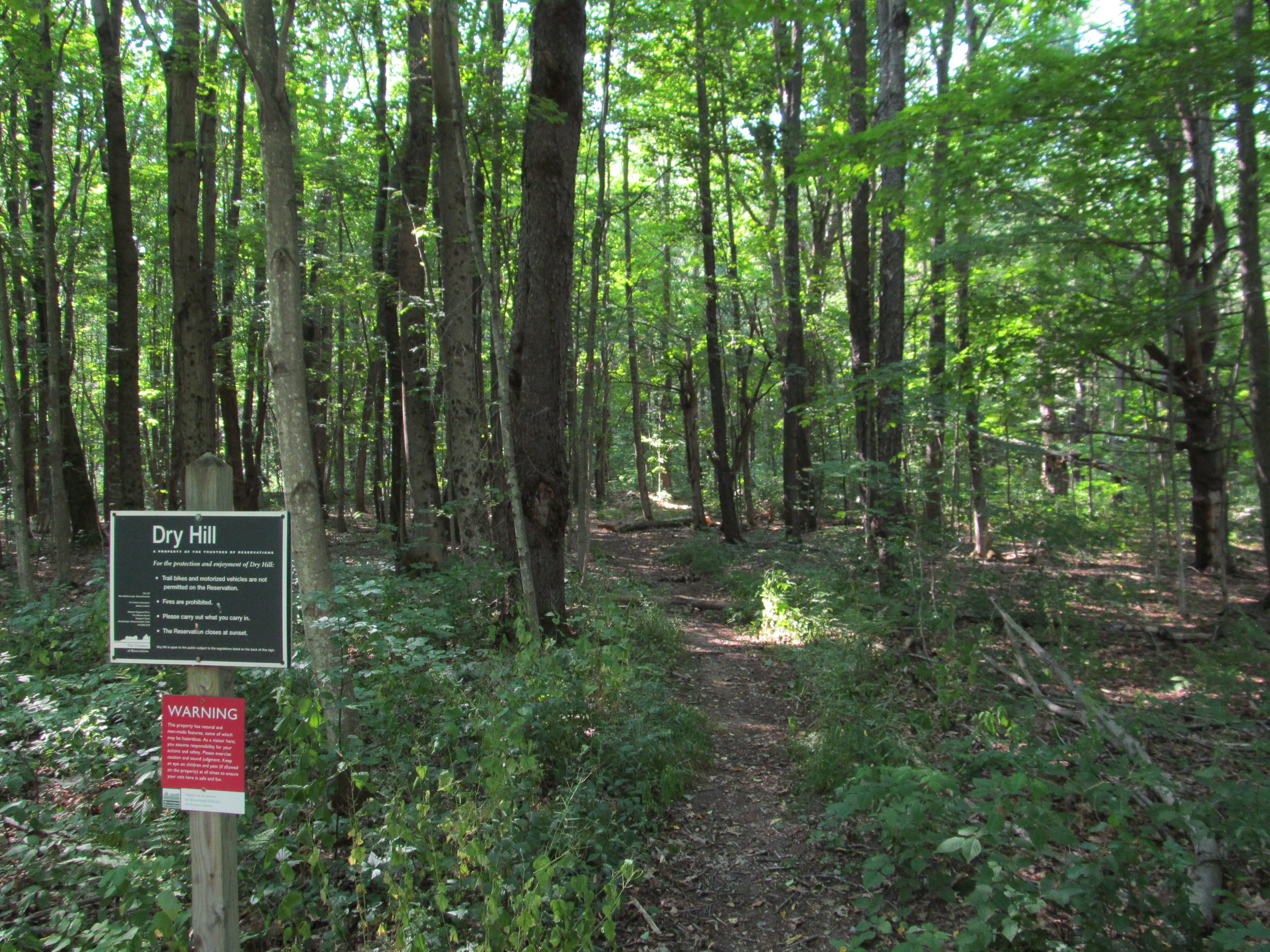
Dry Hill

Dry Hill is a 206-acre (0.83 km^{2}) nature preserve in New Marlborough, Massachusetts and is managed by the Trustees of Reservations, who acquired the land in 2000. It includes a 1.5-mile (2.4 km) hiking trail of medium to strenuous difficulty.
