= Lyman Reserve =

Nature reserve in Massachusetts, United States

Coordinates: 41.7639°N 70.6315°W

The Lyman Reserve is a 210-acre (0.85 km^{2}) nature reserve in Bourne, Plymouth and Wareham, Massachusetts and is managed by the Trustees of Reservations. There are 1.5 miles (2.4 km) of hiking trails, a beach and is in proximity to the Red Brook Reserve and Red Brook Wildlife Management Area. The area was formerly a private fishing camp, which sits at the mouth of Red Brook at Buttermilk Bay. It is home to one of the last remaining groups of sea-run brook trout ("salters") in the Eastern United States.

Red Brook was established as a preserve in 2001.
