= Tyringham Cemetery =

Historic cemetery in Massachusetts, United States

- U.S. National Register of Historic Places
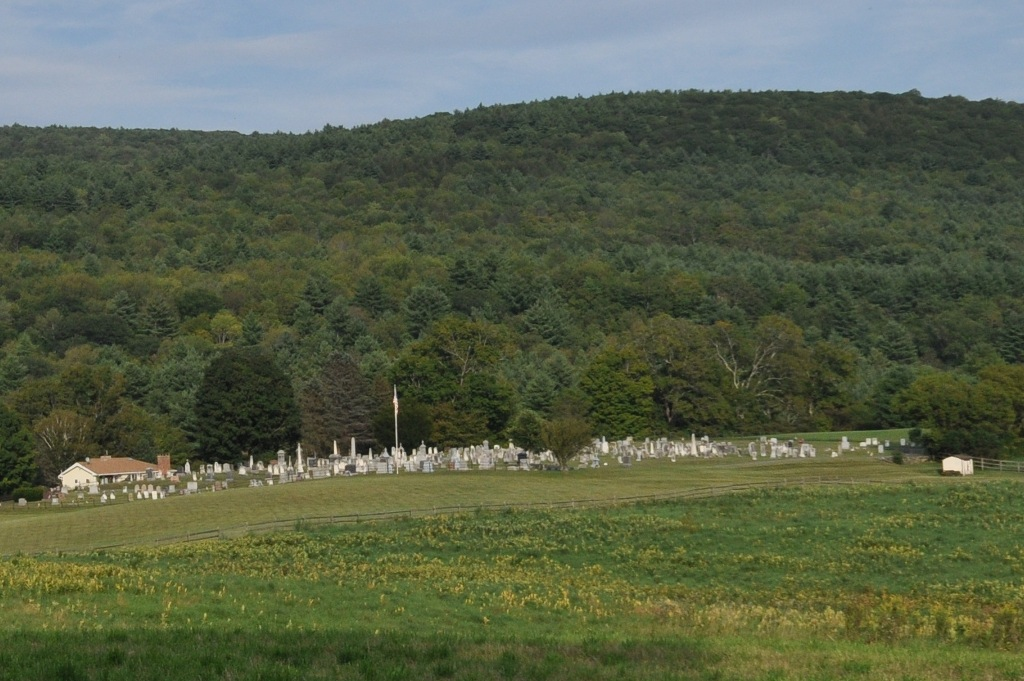

- Location within Massachusetts Location within the United States
- Location: Church St., Tyringham, Massachusetts
- Coordinates: 42°14′34″N 73°12′5″W
- Area: 3.67 acres (1.49 ha)
- Built: 1804
- NRHP reference No.: 09000716
- Added to NRHP: September 16, 2009

Tyringham Cemetery is a historic cemetery section just outside the historic center of Tyringham, Massachusetts. The 3.67 acres (1.49 ha) property lies on the west side of Church Street, opposite the Union Church. The historically designated portion of the cemetery excludes a 4 acres (1.6 ha) parcel that was purchased in the 2000s.

Housatonic Township #1, of which Tyringham was a part, was settled in 1739, and was incorporated as Tyringham in 1767. Its original town center is located in Monterey, which separated in 1847. The current town center developed around the first meeting house to be built in the northern section of the township, around 1779. Its precise location is not known, but is believed to be within the bounds of the cemetery; one potential location is indicated by a stone marker.

The cemetery is ringed by an iron picket fence donated in 1892 by the Hale family. It contains more than 800 gravestones, dating from 1797 to the present. The earliest stones were generally made for marble, which was quarried from nearby Berkshire County towns, while later monuments were made of granite. An unusually large number of markers (fourteen) are made of "white bronze", marketed by the Monumental Bronze Company of Bridgeport, Connecticut between 1874 and 1914. Two unusual markers are in the shape of truncated tree trunks, their inscriptions incised on scrolls that appear to be suspended from the top of the marker; perhaps in a contrast to their elaborate nature, they commemorate working-class individuals. Prominent burials in the cemetery include members of the Garland and Hale families, both of which have lineage to the town's early settlers.

== See also ==
- National Register of Historic Places listings in Berkshire County, Massachusetts
