= Henry Hudson Kitson =

American sculptor

Sir Henry Hudson Kitson
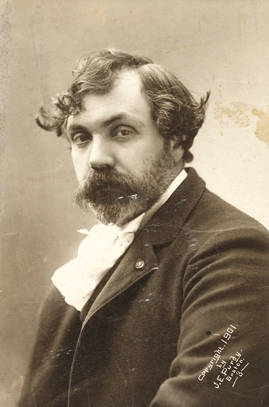
- Born: April 9, 1863; Huddersfield, West Yorkshire, England, UK
- Died: June 26, 1947 (aged 84); Tyringham, Massachusetts, U.S.
- Known for: Sculpture
- Spouse: Theo Alice Ruggles Kitson (m.1893-div.1909)

Henry Hudson Kitson (April 9, 1863, 1864 or 1865 – June 26, 1947) was an English-American sculptor who created representations of American military heroes.

Romania's Queen Elisabeth knighted him after he sculpted a marble bust of her in the early 1900s. His student and first wife, Theo Alice Ruggles Kitson was a sculptor as well, and his brothers, John William Kitson, Samuel James Kitson, and Robert Lewellen Kitson, also had art careers in the United States. He is perhaps best known in the U.S. for his sculpture of the "Minute Man" (minutemen) on Lexington Green, in Lexington, Massachusetts.

== Life ==
Kitson migrated to the United States about 1877/8 where he apprenticed with his oldest brother John William Kitson. William Kitson was in business with another Englishman Robert Ellin; their firm, Ellin & Kitson, were identified as architectural sculptors. They specialized in interior carving and wood work in commercial structures and churches. Some buildings they worked on were the Equitable Building, the Tilden Mansion, the Astor Memorial Redos and the William K. Vanderbilt House.

Kitson and Samuel James Kitson the next oldest brother were both associated with Ellin & Kitson doing sculptural work. According to family oral history, William now quite successful encouraged and financially provided for Harry Kitson to move to Paris 1n 1882 where he studied at the École des Beaux-Arts under the sculptor Jean-Marie Bonnassieux and sculptor Dumont. Kitson also was enrolled in the École nationale supérieure des arts décoratifs studying under Millet and Ganter. He returned first in 1884/5 to NYC to his eldest brother William's business but in 1886 removed to Boston where his sculptor brother Sam had established a studio. Once there Kitson received numerous commissions and began teaching. His students included portrait sculptor Leila Usher. John William Kitson died in 1888 and Samuel James had returned to Boston after a stay in Washington, DC. The youngest brother, Robert Lewellen Kitson, a water-colorist, joined his older brothers in Boston about 1902.

In 1893, Kitson married Theo Alice Ruggles, a former student of his, who went on to have a successful career of her own as Theo Alice Ruggles Kitson. Theo and Harry had three children: Theo (called Babs), John, who became a civil engineer, and Dorothy. None of the children had issue. The noted sculptor Gaston Lachaise worked in his atelier at 7 MacDougal Alley down the alley from Gertrude Vanderbilt Whitney. Many of Henry Hudson Kitson papers are in the Archives of American Art in Washington, D.C., as well as the New York Historical Society. Kitson only carried a British passport.

He was the author of numerous public monuments, and left behind his home, Santarella, in Tyringham. The home, which Kitson modified extensively, was recently restored and now operates as a special events venue as well as providing overnight accommodation.

== Gallery ==
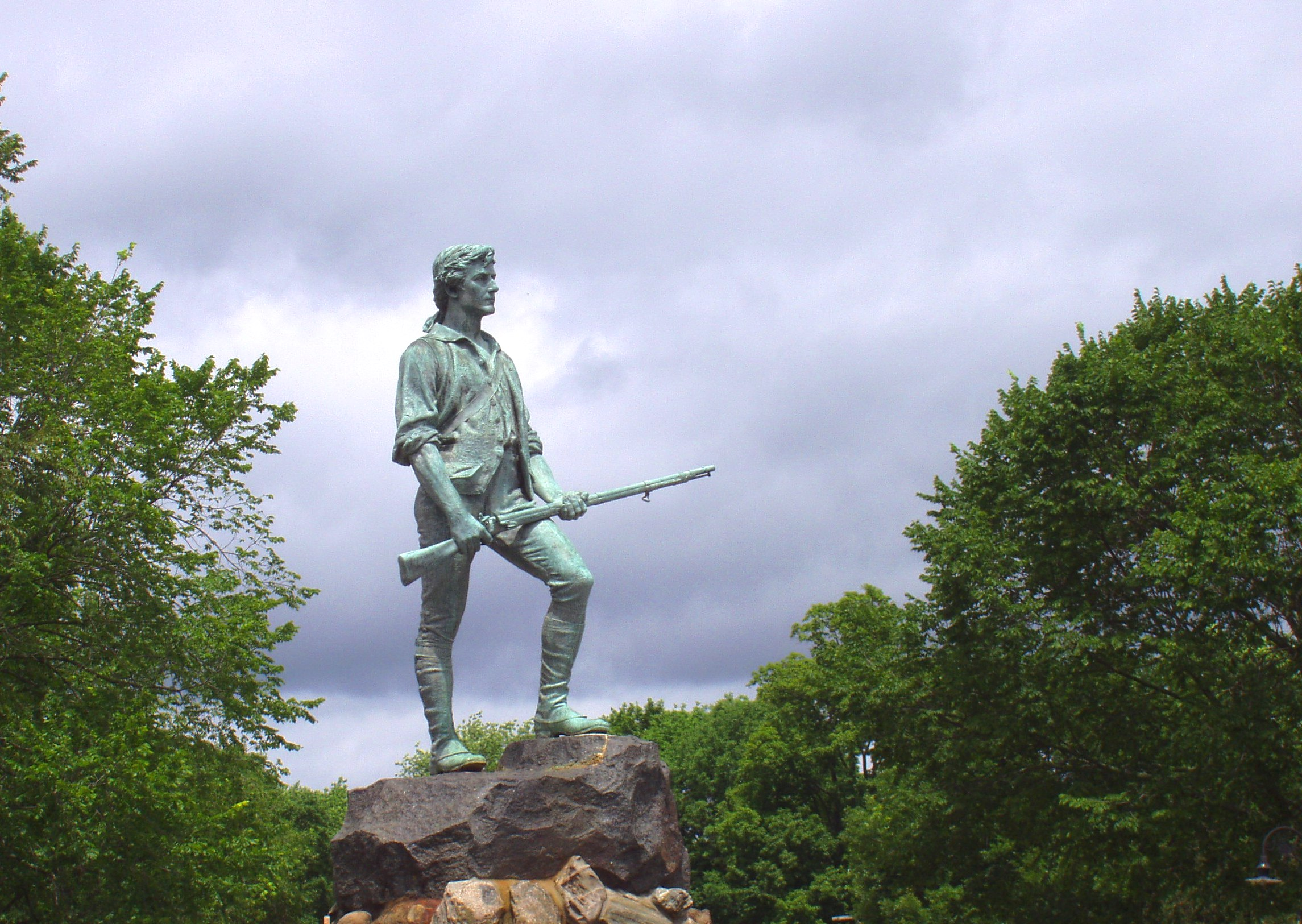
Minute Man Statue, Lexington, Massachusetts

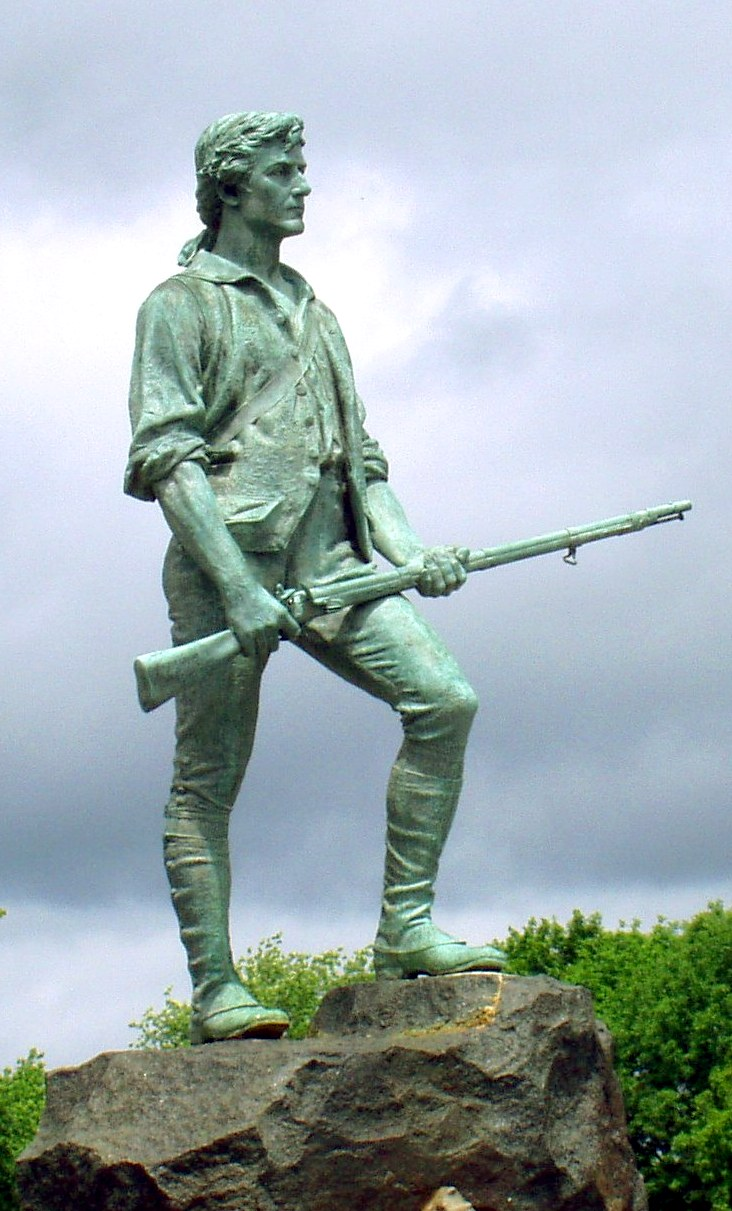
Closeup view of Minute Man Statue

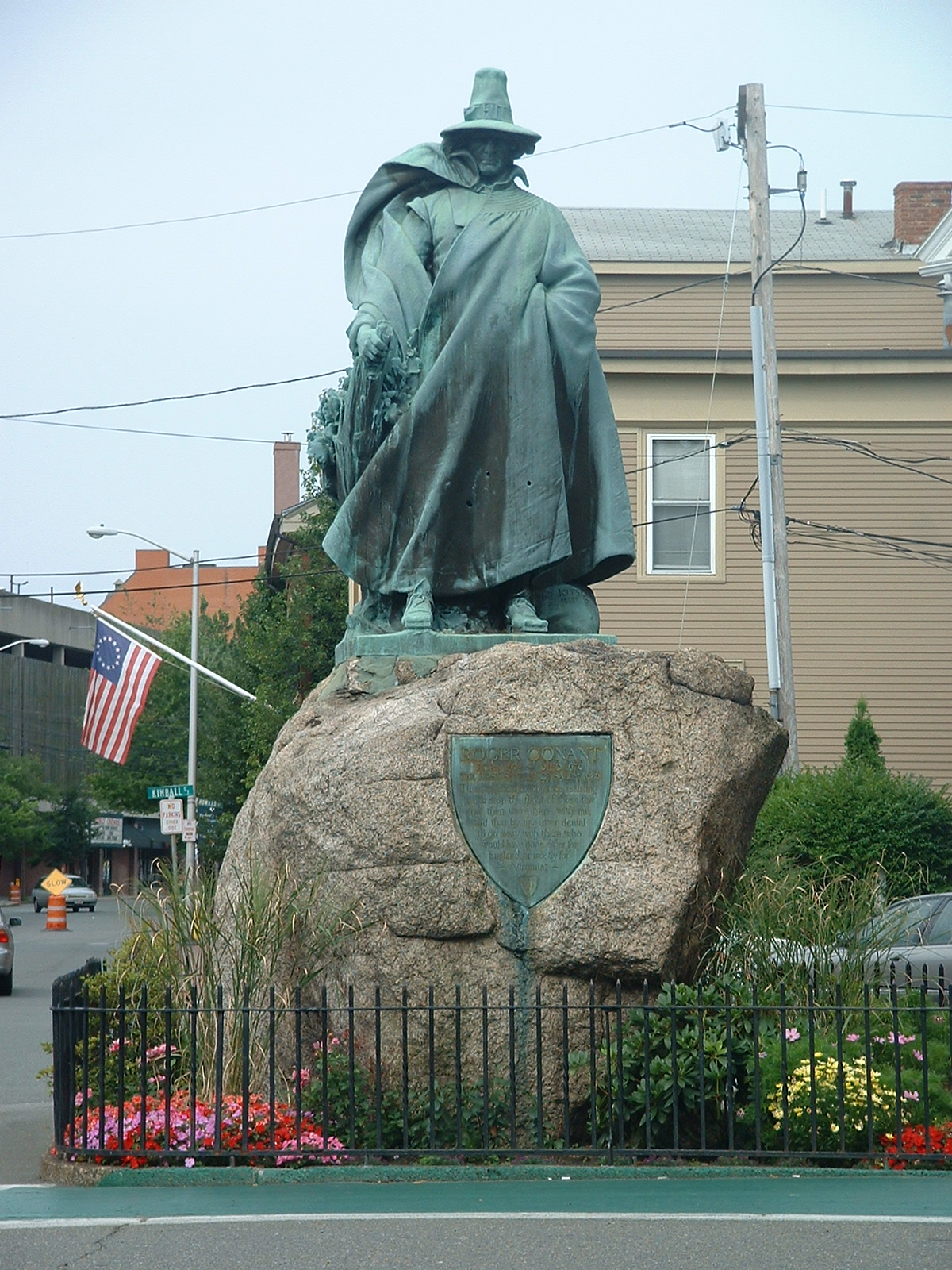
Roger Conant Statue, Salem, Massachusetts

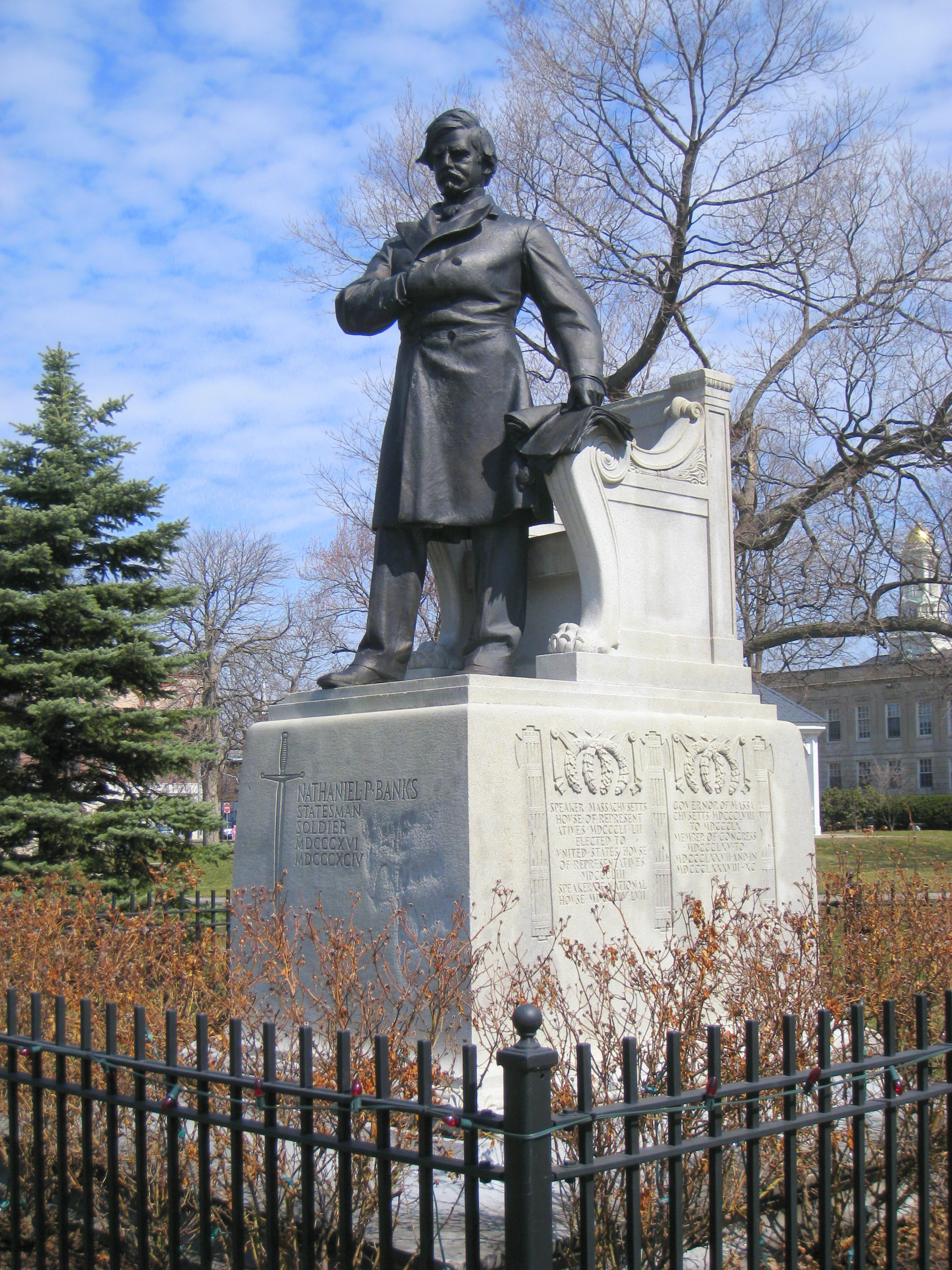
Nathaniel P. Banks, Waltham, Massachusetts

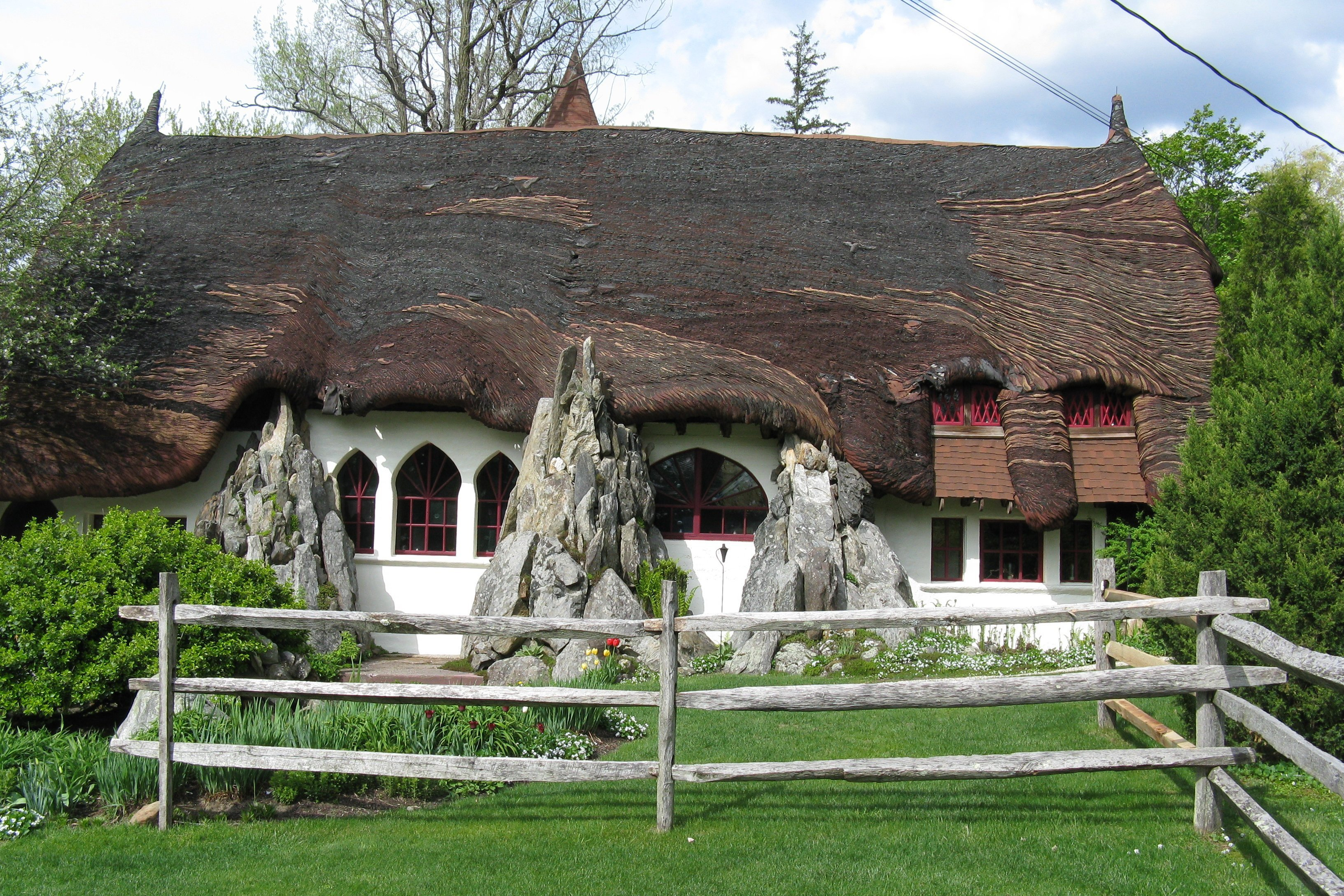
Santarella, Tyringham, Massachusetts

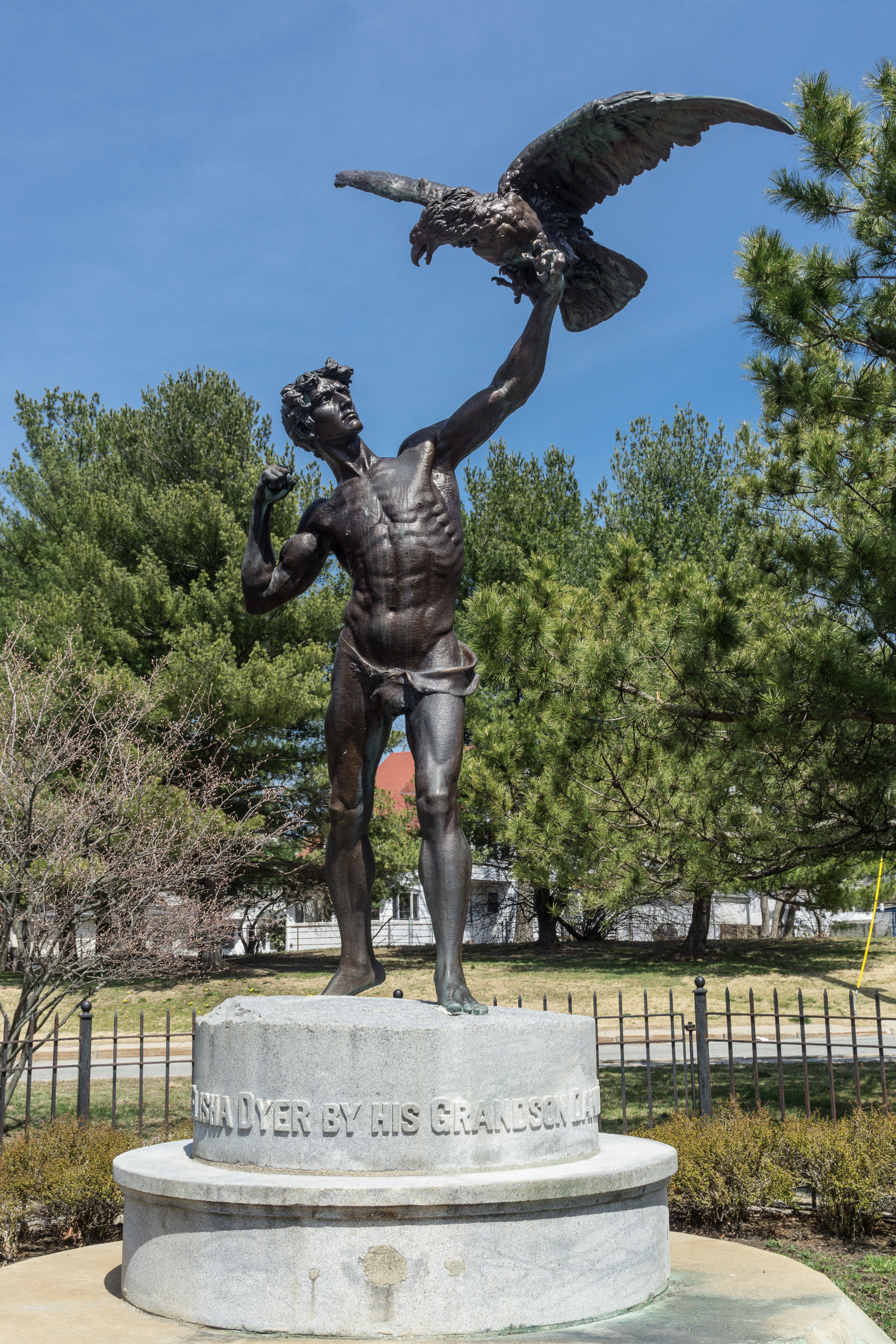
The Falconer, Roger Williams Park, Providence, Rhode Island. 1893.

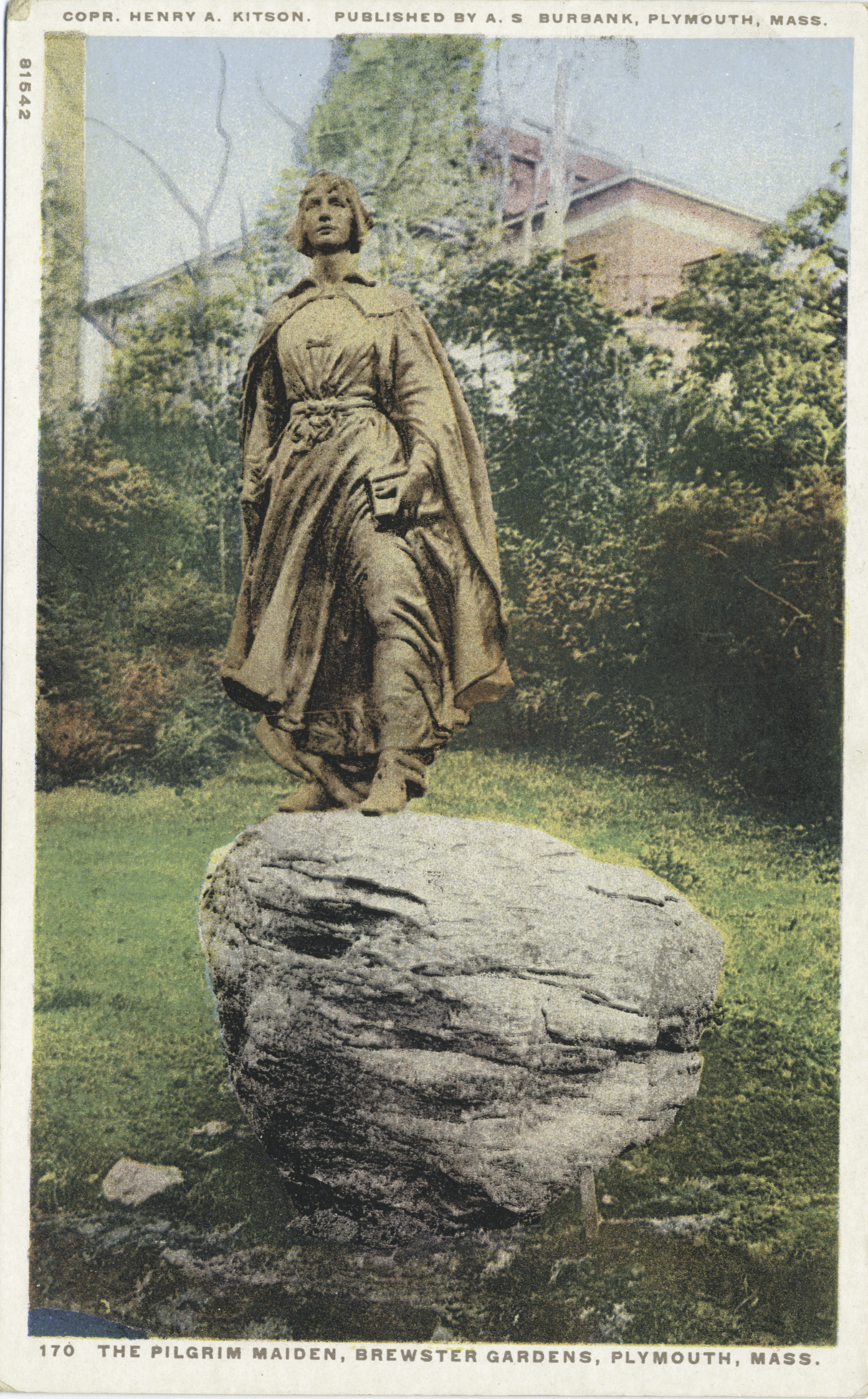
The Pilgrim Maiden, Brewster Gardens, Plymouth, Massachusetts

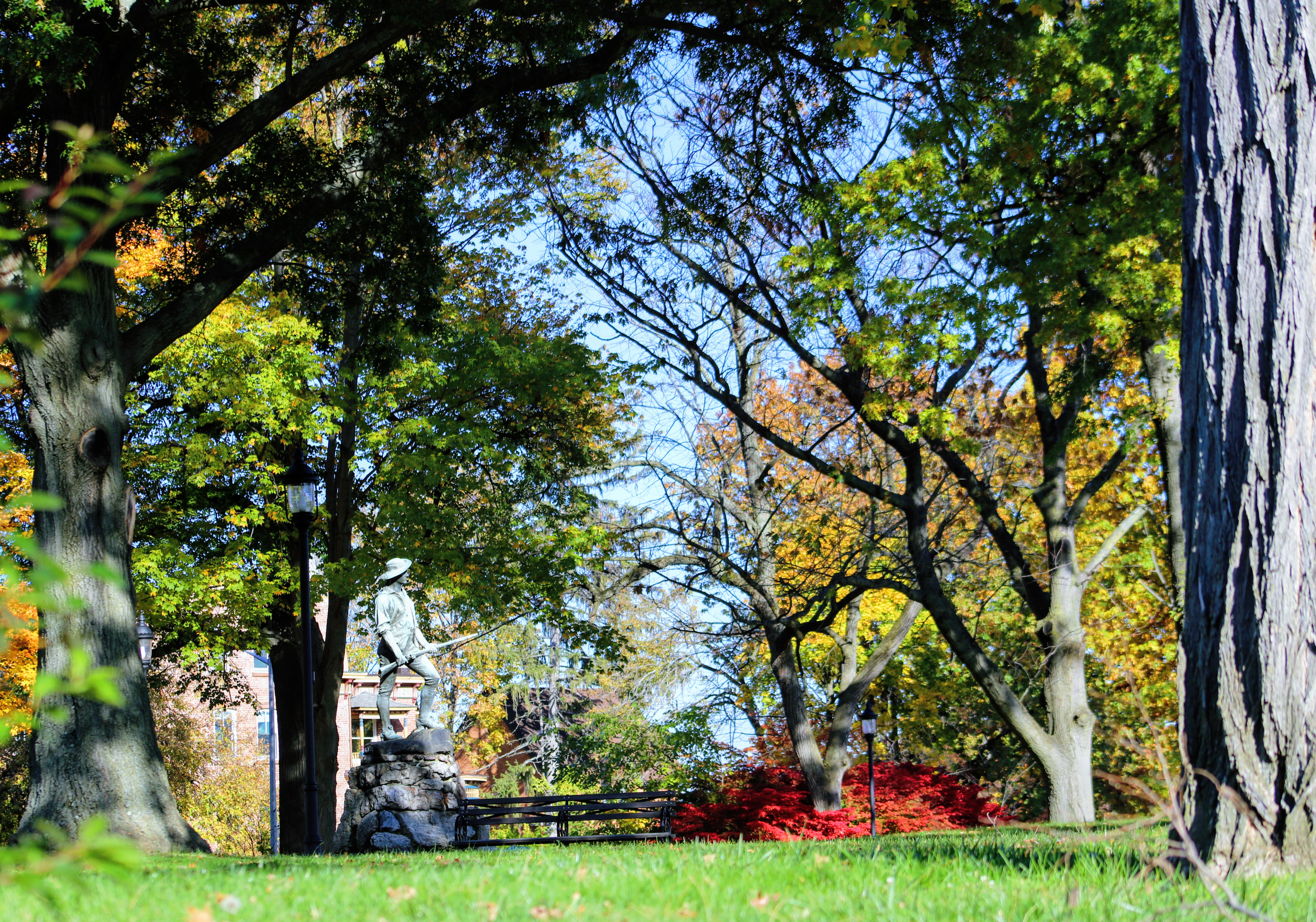
The Minuteman, at Hasbrouck House, Washington's Headquarters State Historic Site in Newburgh, New York, 1924

=== Vicksburg National Military Park ===
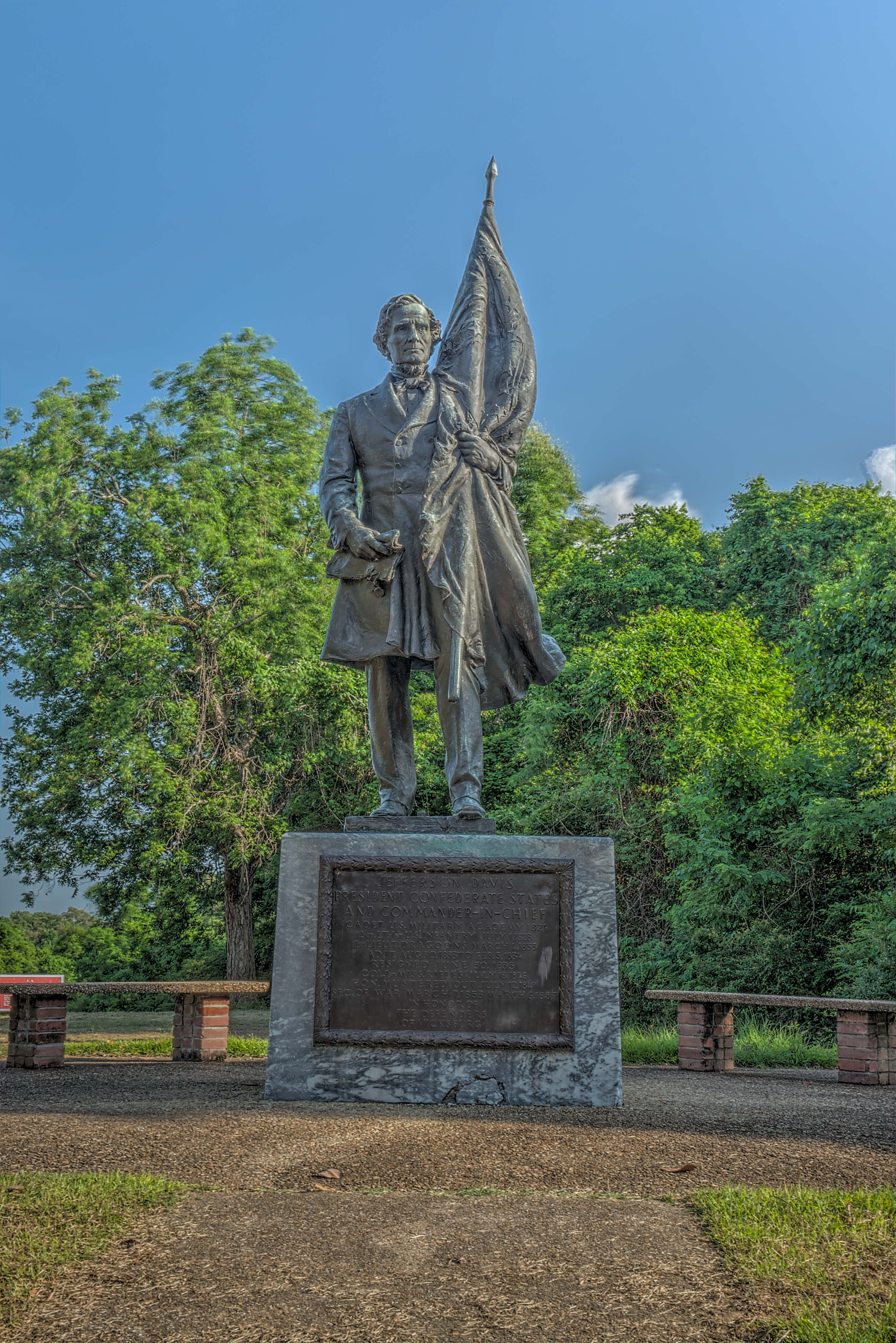
Statue of Jefferson Davis, 1927

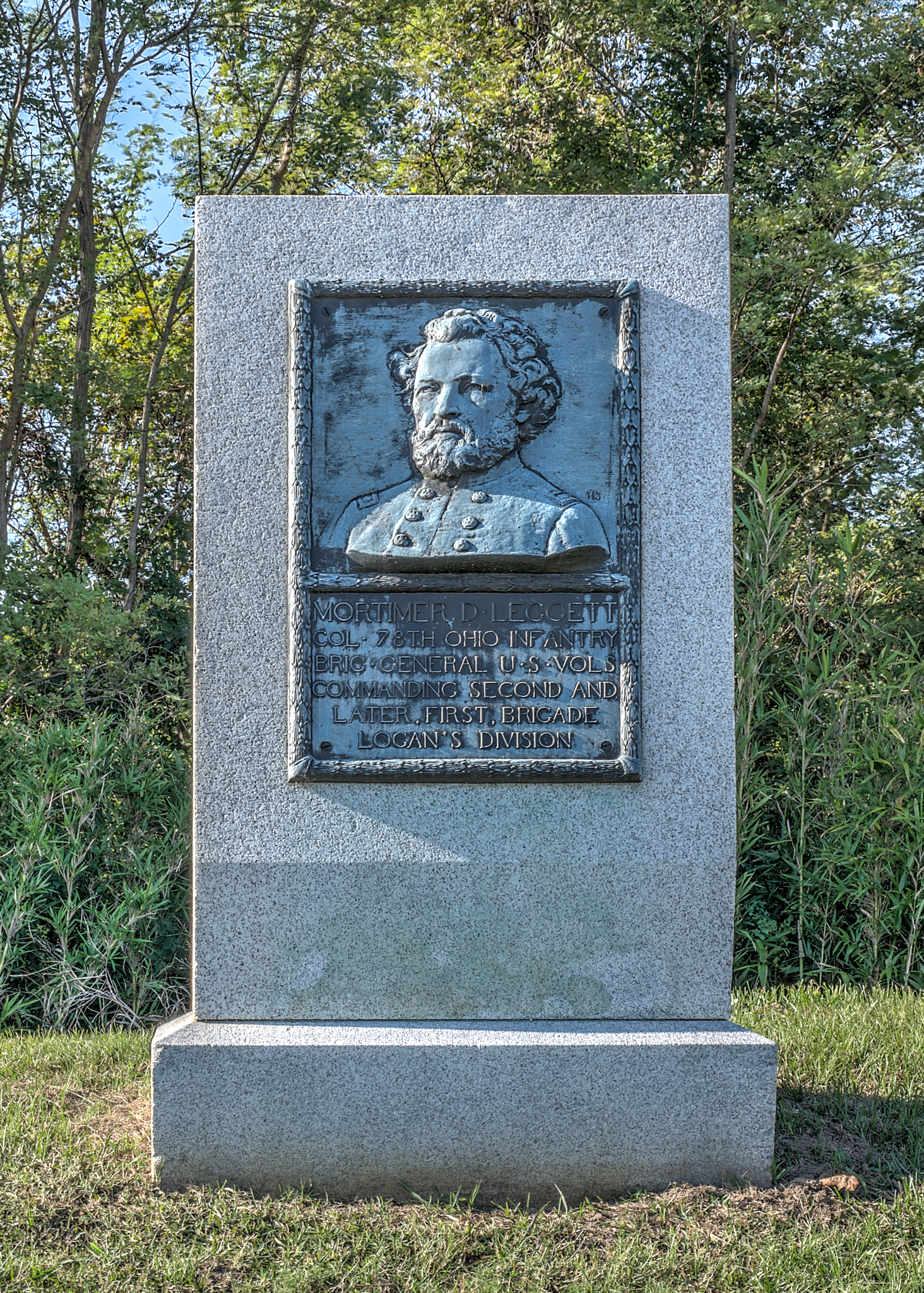
Relief portrait of Col. Mortimer D. Leggett, 1911

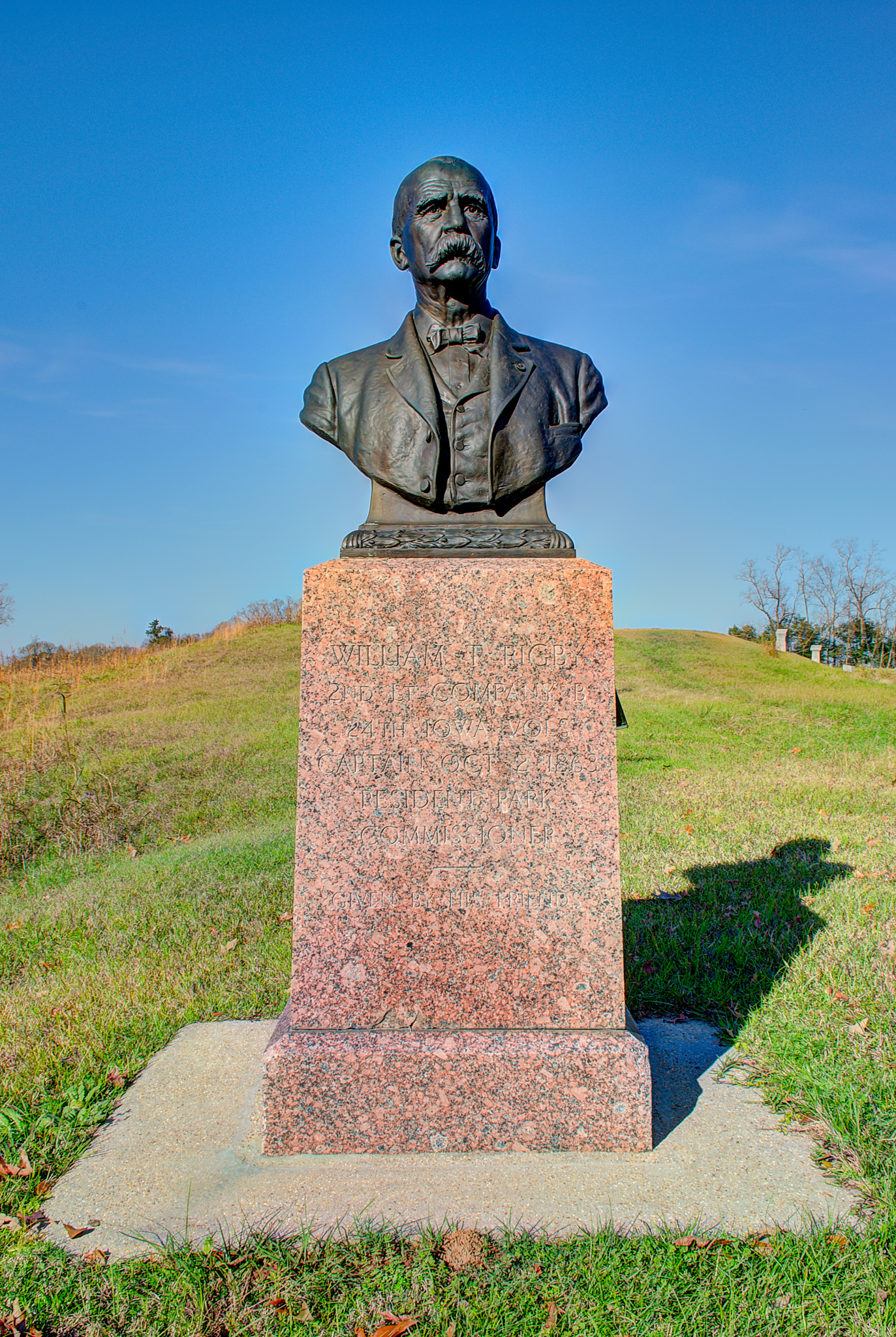
Bust of Capt. William T Rigby, 1928

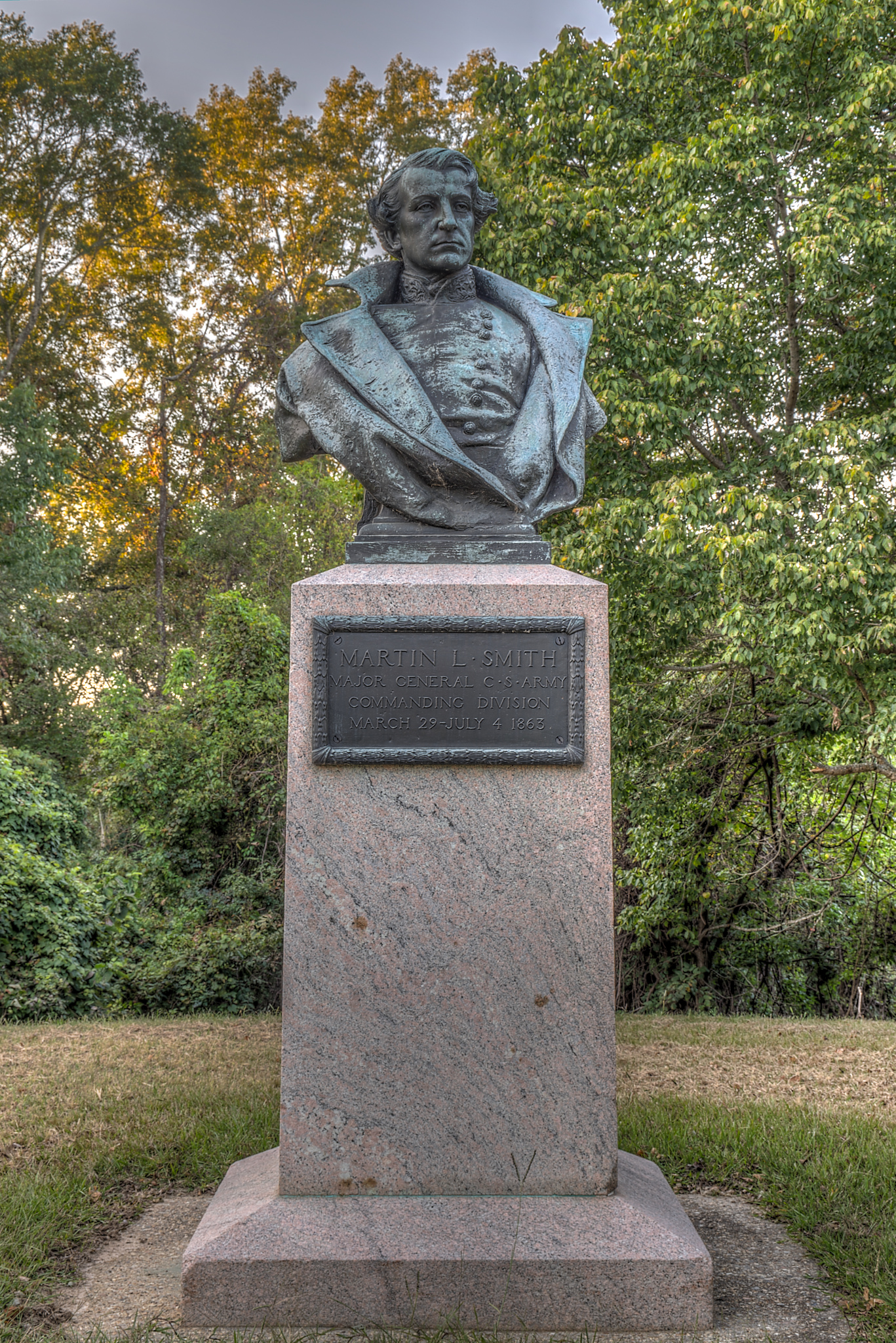
Bust of Maj. Gen. Martin L. Smith, 1911

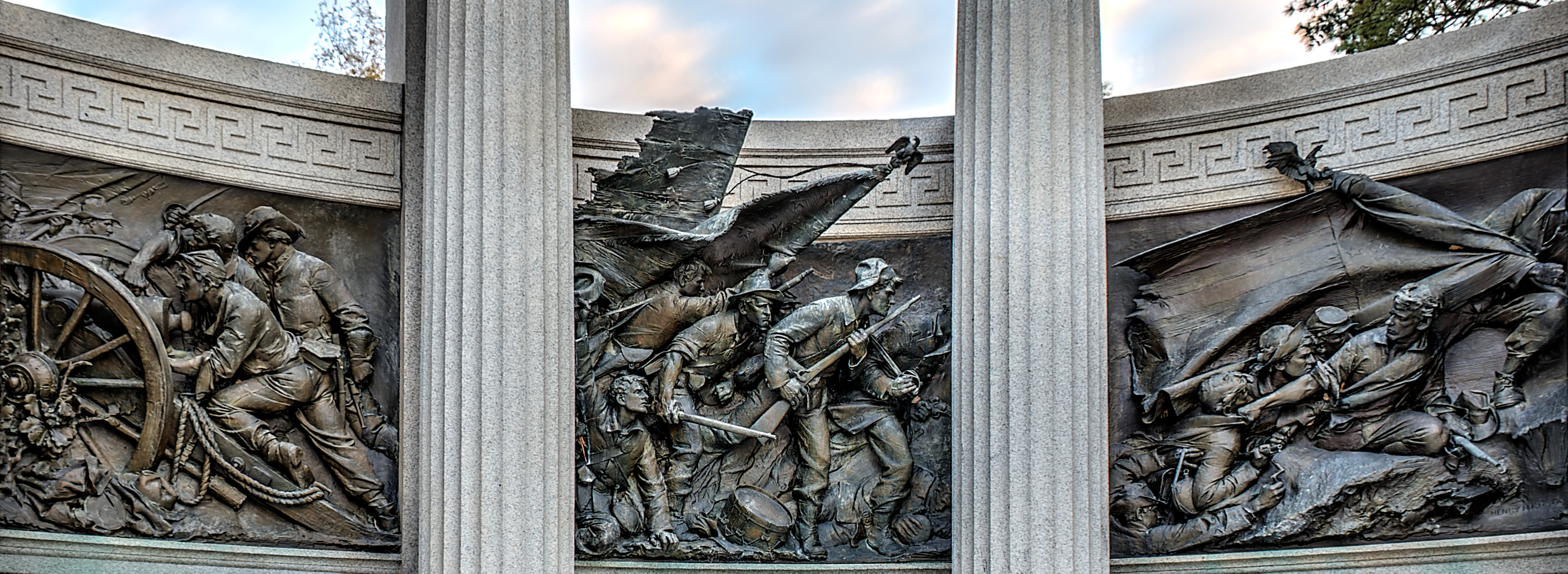
Bronze Relief Panels on Iowa State Memorial

== Selected works ==
- Vicksburg National Military Park has the following works by Kitson:
  - Confederate President Jefferson Davis (statue) 1927
  - Iowa Monument (six relief panels 1906 and equestrian statue 1912)
  - Iowa Governor Samuel J. Kirkwood (bust) 1928
  - Union Brig. Gen. Mortimer D. Leggett (relief portrait) 1911
  - Confederate Brig. Gen. Stephen D. Lee (statue) 1909 (first chairman of the Vicksburg NMP Commission)
  - Union Maj. Gustavus Lightfoot (relief portrait) 1914
  - Union Adm. David Glasgow Farragut (statue on Navy Monument) 1917
  - Union Lt. William T. Rigby (bust) 1928 (Resident Commissioner of VNMP 1899–1929)
  - Union Lt. Cmdr. Thomas O. Selfridge Jr. (bust) 1913
  - Confederate Maj. Gen. Martin L. Smith (bust) 1911
- Boston area
  - Nathaniel P. Banks, Waltham, Massachusetts
  - David Farragut, Marine Park, South Boston, Massachusetts, 1881
  - Thomas A. Doyle (mayor) monument, Providence, Rhode Island 1889
  - Minute man statue, Lexington, Massachusetts town green 1900 (often mistaken to be of minuteman Captain John Parker)
  - Roger Conant statue at Salem, Massachusetts 1905
  - Robert Burns 1920 Back Bay Fens, Boston. Relocated to Winthrop Square, Boston 1975. Returned to its original Fens location October 2019.
  - Henry B. Endicott tablet, Boston, Massachusetts 1921
  - The Pilgrim Maiden statue, Brewster Gardens, Plymouth, Massachusetts 1922
  - Sir Richard Saltonstall monument, Watertown, Massachusetts 1931
- Kentucky
  - Lloyd Tilghman Memorial in Paducah, Kentucky
