= Statue of David Farragut =

Statue of David Farragut may refer to:

- Statue of David Farragut (Boston)
- Statue of David Farragut (New York City)
- Statue of David Farragut (Washington, D.C.)
