= Ellin & Kitson =

American architectural firm, 1879 to 1902

Ellin & Kitson partnership was formed in New York City by two English sculptors from Yorkshire, England in early 1879. Prior to this date they were working as Robert Ellin Company. They advertised their business as architectural sculptors concentrating on churches.

The elder was Robert Ellin, born 1837; the younger was John William Kitson, born in 1846. According to the Kitson family, it was Ellin who first came to the United States and then encouraged Kitson to follow. Their first known collaboration was a mahogany breakfront entered into a juried show for the United States Centennial held in Philadelphia in 1876. According to Kitson family history, they entered their work as Americans, thinking it would set them apart from the many English entries. At the time of the Centennial celebration, their firm had been awarded the execution of the Astor Memorial Altar. The breakfront was very noted and won a prize. In addition to the breakfront, they also entered various church furnishings, which was their company emphasis. Kitson family oral history tells of many trips which William took to South America to personally select the mahogany and other woods for various projects.

Ellin & Kitson as well as Ellin, Kitson & Co worked with many famous architects and designers of the time: Thomas Wisedell, Robert J Withers, Frederick Law Olmsted, Richard Morris Hunt, J. Cleaveland Cady, George B. Post to name a few.

Some of the buildings they were involved with are: W E Dodge house, Jamees A Roosevelt house; the Tilden home, the William Kissam Vanderbilt house, the Cornelius Vanderbilt house, the Marquand mansion; Collis P Huntington house; Senator Dodge of Montana House in NYC; the Equitable Insurance Building; Mutual Life Insurance Company (Nassau Street); Prudential Life Insurance Building; Marble House, Newport, Rhode Island; The Breakers, Newport RI; the Goelet house, Newport RI; Chapel of the Good Shepherd, General Theological Seminary [New York City]; Grace Church, Trinity Church Astor Redoes, Trinity Chapel, all in New York City; St. Thomas' Church, Mamaroneck, Westchester County, New York; new Old South Church, Boston; Small Gothic Church designed by J Cleveland Cady somewhere up the Hudson River. Additionally, they constructed a vast number of buildings at the 1892 Chicago Exposition.

Earlier work circa 1867 by Ellin with James Whitehouse are Panels on the Mall in Central Park. Earlier independent work of William Kitson in 1870 on the capitals of the interior columns of Second Presbyterian Church in Philadelphia.

In addition to various tradesmen employed by the firm, William's younger brother Samuel James Kitson was often involved, especially when fine sculptures were to be a part of the project. Samuel Kitson did not depend on commissions from the firm as he secured commissions on his own ability and artistic talent. Another younger brother, Harry (Henry Hudson Kitson), apprenticed with the firm until 1882, when he began attending art school in Paris, France.

Following the death of William Kitson in 1888, the firm was known as Ellin, Kitson and Company, omitting the ampersand with the John William Kitson Estate remaining as a silent partner. In 1902 the partnership of Ellin, Kitson & Co was dissolved. Robert Ellin then formed another partnership with J W Harrison as Ellin Kitson and Company. Following Robert Ellin's death in February 1904, the firm continued under the guidance of J W Harrison. As late as 1913, Ellin Kitson and Company were advertising their services in trade magazines.

Columbia University has in their special collections department a style book attributed to Ellin & Kitson.
