= John William Kitson =

British artist (1846–1888)

- Born: 1846; Berry Brow, Huddersfield, England
- Died: February 6, 1888 (aged 41–42)
- Known for: Architectural sculptor
- Spouse: May Kitson
- Family: Samuel James Kitson (Brother)

John William Kitson (1846 – February 6, 1888) was an English-born architectural sculptor who worked in the United States.

== Early life ==
Kitson, the third child and the first-born son of John McWhire and Emma Jaggar Kitson, was born in 1846 in Berry Brow, Huddersfield. He was sent to London at the age of 14 as an apprentice to learn the art of stone and wood sculpturing. By 1870 he was living in Philadelphia with other architects and sculptors.

== Sculptor career ==
Kitson was active in the United States 1868 – 1888 as a sculptor of wood and stone. He and his fellow Englishman, Robert Ellin, joined forces 1n 1874 under the name Robert Ellin Co and created an architectural sculptor partnership, Ellin & Kitson, based in New York City in 1879. Just prior to Kitson's 1888 death, the firm became known as Ellin, Kitson & Co. Kitson's estate remained as partner in the firm until 1904 when his eldest child reached maturity. This also coincided with Robert Ellin's death.

According to family oral stories Kitson and Ellin decided to compete in a juried show for the 1876 centennial as Americans to set themselves apart from other English entrants. Their mahogany breakfront won an award and has been noted in articles about the 1876 centennial show. In this exhibit they also showed examples of their church furnishings.

Neither William nor his partner Robert were known for fine art sculpture. Instead, their work was seen as a part of the exterior and interior of churches and commercial buildings and elegant homes; their work also included carved furniture such as seen in the 1876 Centennial Exposition held in Philadelphia, PA.

Kitson has been attributed with carving stone columns of the National Art Institute NYC now known as the National Academy. These have been lost. His work is also seen in an upstairs meeting room of the Tilden Mansion, now the National Arts Club, in a carved frieze of birds against a gold leaf ground. Circa 1872 at Philadelphia's First Presbyterian Church on Walnut, Kitson and Alexander M. Calder carved all exterior and interior stone and woodwork. According to family oral history, he was known for his bird sculptures. One of his beautiful breakfronts is still in family hands. An example of his birds in walnut is also in family hands.

Kitson married 1882 to Mary Ann Morrell, also known as May Kitson, whose family arrived in New Jersey from London, England in 1873. In February 1888 he died at the age of 43 of back injuries, leaving his 25-year-old wife with a son Howard Waldo age 5 and an infant daughter Velma Mary aged 8 months. He is buried in Woodlawn. Velma Mary later married Byron McCandless and was the grandmother of Astronaut Bruce McCandless. (Note: Rosemary McCandless, granddaughter of Velma Mary Kitson McCandless)

== Brothers ==
All four Kitson brothers (Will, Sam, Harry and Rob) moved to the United States. Samuel James Kitson, a fine sculptor, attended the Rome Academy 1870 – 1873. He was promoted by Ellin & Kitson while he developed his own career beginning 1878. Younger brother Harry, Henry Hudson Kitson, was sent at the age of 14 to apprentice with John William and Samuel James and then moved to Paris for his sculpturing education. The youngest brother, Robert Lewellen Kitson, arrived in the United States following his mother's death in 1898. Robert displayed some watercolors in the English Royal Academy of the Arts. He was a watercolorist of whose work very little is known to survive.
