= McLennan Reservation =

Nature reserve in Massachusetts, United States

Coordinates: 42°13′17″N 73°10′29″W

McLennan Reservation is a nature reserve located in Otis and Tyringham, Massachusetts. The property is owned by The Trustees of Reservations through a series of endowments for preserving the land, the first in 1977. The reservation is adjacent to another Trustees property, Ashintully Gardens.

The 2.4 miles (3.9 km) Round Mountain Trail loops around the reservation.

== See also ==
Ashintully Gardens
