= Methodist Episcopal Society of Tyringham =

Historic church in Massachusetts, United States

- U.S. National Register of Historic Places
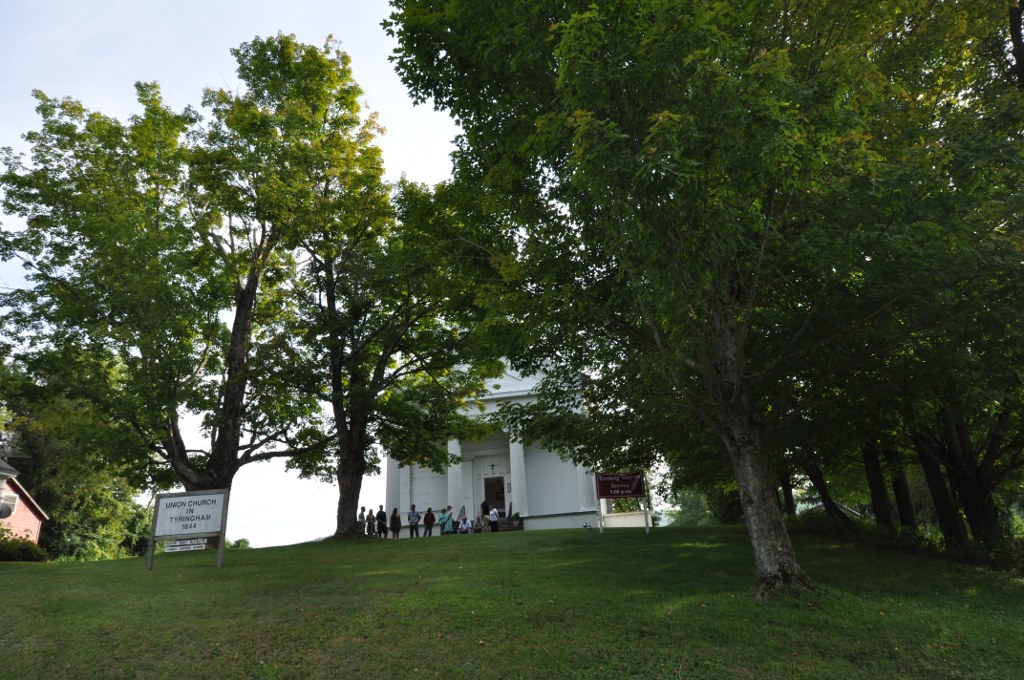

- Location within Massachusetts Location within the United States
- Location: 128-130 Main Rd., Tyringham, Massachusetts
- Coordinates: 42°14′38″N 73°12′10″W
- Area: 1.2 acres (0.49 ha)
- Built: 1844
- Architect: Porter, Carter and Crittenden
- Architectural style: Greek Revival
- NRHP reference No.: 00000986
- Added to NRHP: August 30, 2000

Methodist Episcopal Society of Tyringham (or the Union Church and Parsonage) is a historic church at 128-130 Main Road in Tyringham, Massachusetts, and is presently the only church standing in the community. The property includes a Greek Revival church building built in 1844, and a parsonage house next door. Between 1844 and 1907, the church was also used for town meetings. The property was listed on the National Register of Historic Places in 2000.

== Description and history ==
The Methodist Episcopal Society of Tyringham is located in Tyringham's small main village, on the west side of Main Road at Church Road, with the parsonage across Church Road to the south. The church is a rectangular wood-frame structure, with a gabled roof and mostly clapboarded exterior. The front facade is finished flushboarding, and is sheltered by a projecting four-column Ionic portico. The columns support a fully pedimented gable, which houses a series of recessed panels. The main facade is blank except for the main entrance and wide corner pilasters. The entrance opening is framed by pilasters and topped by a broad corniced entablature; the doorway within the opening is framed by paneling matching that of the door. The church's tower rises to a height of 70 feet (21 m) in square tiered stages.

The church was built in 1844, when the community was at the height of its prosperity, and is one of Berkshire County's finest examples of Greek Revival church architecture. It was built by a Reformed Methodist congregation as its second sanctuary, the first having been destroyed by fire. The house was built around the same time as the church as a private residence, and was only acquired for use as a parsonage in 1903. The parsonage is a modest 1 1/2-story gable-front structure, with a single-story ell (a 20th-century addition) extending to the south.

== See also ==
- National Register of Historic Places listings in Berkshire County, Massachusetts
