= Hop Brook Valley =

Valley in Massachusetts, United States

Coordinates: 42°13′45″N 73°11′48″W

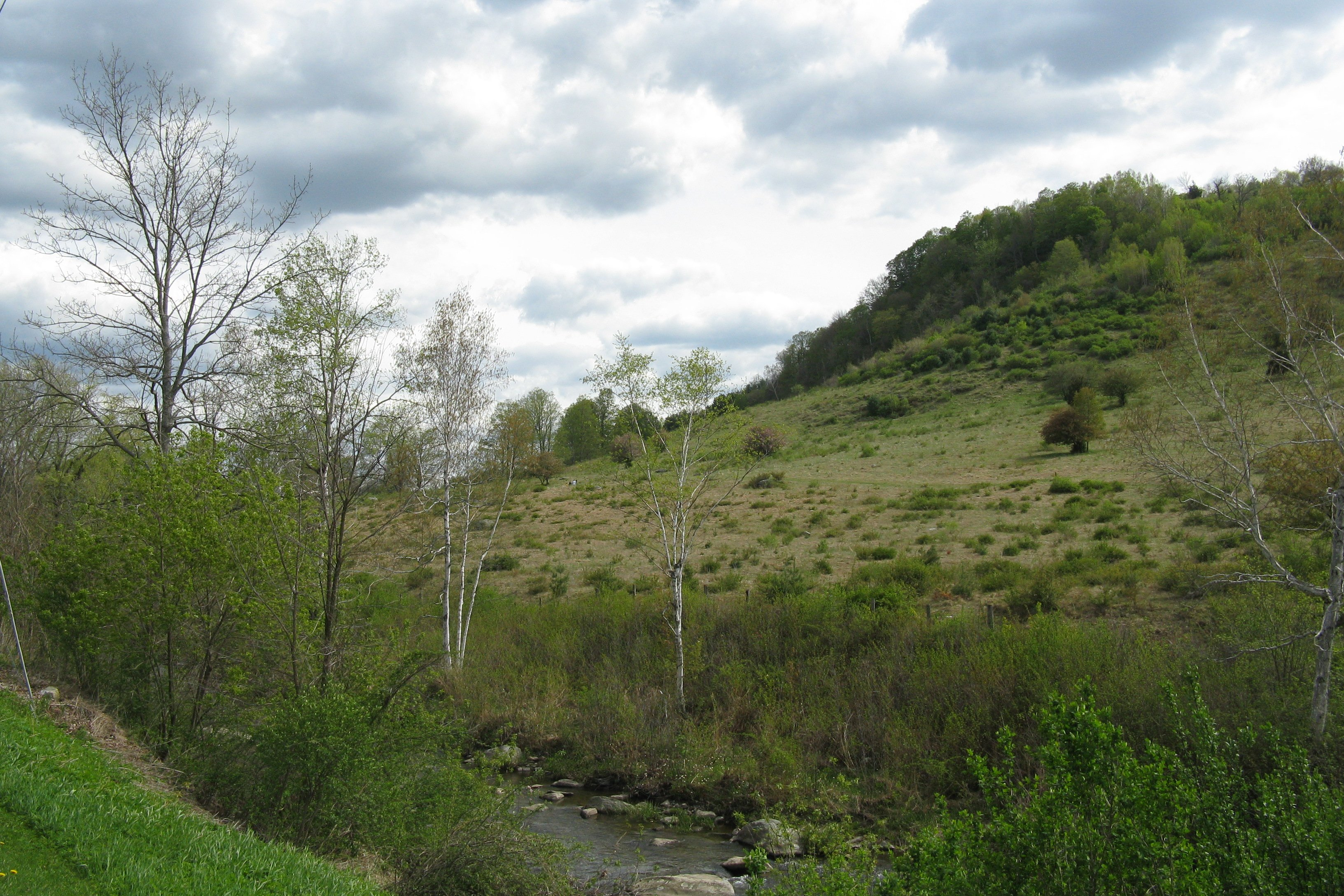
Hop Brook

The Hop Brook Valley (also known as the Tyringham Valley) is a valley in southeastern Berkshire County, Massachusetts. The valley lies predominantly in the town of Tyringham, Massachusetts, although a good portion of it is located in the neighboring town of Lee. Because of its rural location, scenic views, and variety of hiking trails, it is considered as a destination for travellers of the region.

== Geography ==
The valley floor at an elevation of about 800 feet (240 m) above sea level. With the mountains (part of the Berkshire Hills) surrounding it rising to elevations between 1,000 and 2,000 feet (300 and 610 m) in elevation. In the center of The Hop Brook Valley lies Hop Brook, a small stream that feeds into the Housatonic River where the Hop Brook Valley meets the Housatonic River Valley. Jerusalem Road traverses along the escarpment on the south side of the valley. Some notable peaks rising above this side of the valley include side include Sky Hill, Beartown Mountain, and Mount Wilcox. All of these mountains are part of the Beartown State Forest, which lies just to the south of the valley. To the north of the valley, lies the peak of Mount Baldy, as well as several other mountains in the area that form a plateau extending northward beyond the valley to Route 90. On this plateau lies Goose Pond, the most elevated body of freshwater in the state. Below this plateau, Main Road, which turns into Tyringham Road when it enters the town of Tyringham, Massachusetts runs parallel to Jerusalem Road, but on the north side of the valley. The small and quaint downtown area of Tyringham, Massachusetts is situated where this road merges with Jerusalem Road at the southeast end of the valley (Jerusalem turns northwards here). Just south of this intersection, in the center of the valley, lies the Tyringham Cobble one of the most notably shaped and prominent physical features of the area. The valley is a popular hiking destination because it is crossed (north to south) by the Appalachian Trail.
