= Martin Luther Smith =

Confederate Army general (1819–1866)

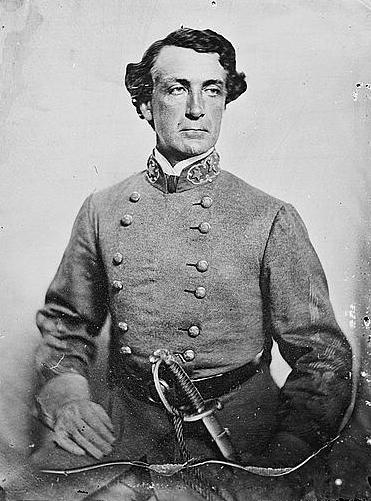
- Born: September 9, 1819; Danby, New York, US
- Died: July 29, 1866 (aged 46); Savannah, Georgia, US
- Burial place: Oconee Hill Cemetery, Athens, Georgia
- Military career
- Allegiance: United States of America; Confederate States of America
- Branch: United States Army; Confederate States Army
- Service years: 1842–1861 (USA); 1861–1865 (CSA)
- Rank: Captain (USA); Major General (CSA)
- Conflicts: Mexican–American War; American Civil War

Martin Luther Smith (September 9, 1819 – July 29, 1866) was an American soldier and civil engineer, serving as a major general in the Confederate States Army. Smith was one of the few Northern-born generals to fight for the Confederacy, as he had served most of his early military career in the South with the United States Army's topographical engineers, marrying a native of Athens, Georgia. He planned and constructed the defenses of Vicksburg.

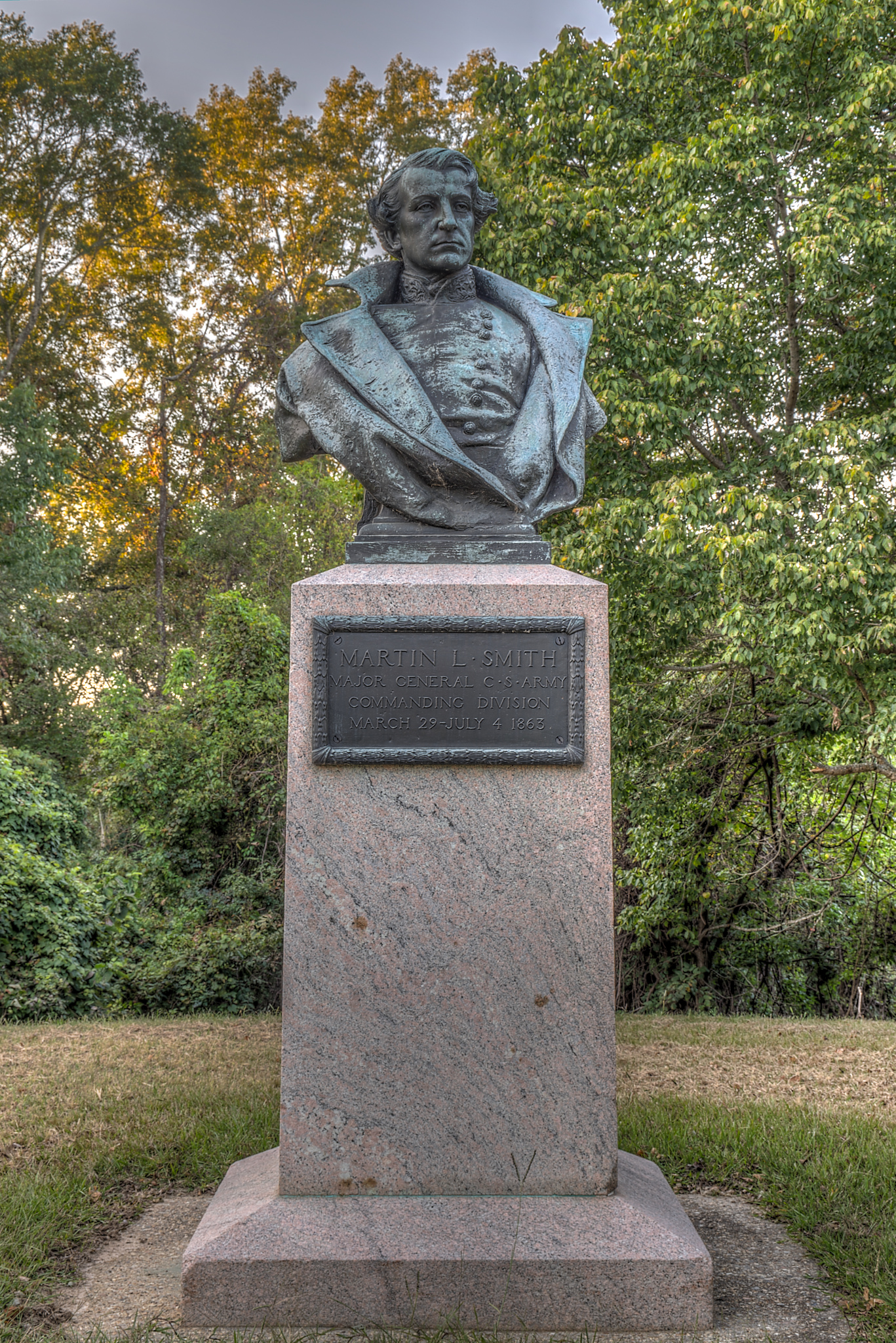
Bust of Smith by Henry Hudson Kitson at Vicksburg National Military Park, 1911

== Early life ==
Smith was born in Danby, New York, where his father had settled after moving from Maine. In 1842, he graduated 16th in his West Point class of 56, which included twenty-two future Civil War generals including James Longstreet, D. H. Hill, and Abner Doubleday. His initial assignment was in Florida, where he surveyed the terrain and drew maps for army usage. In 1846, he married a Georgia woman and subsequently raised a family.

He served as an engineer during the Mexican–American War, and was brevetted for his performance in mapping the valley of Mexico City prior to Winfield Scott's assaults. He returned to Florida after the war. He was promoted from second lieutenant to first lieutenant in 1853. Three years later, he was elevated to captain. He resigned from the army on April 1, 1861, to side with the Confederacy.

== Civil War ==
After resigning, he was commissioned as a major of engineers. In February 1862, Smith was appointed colonel of the 21st Louisiana. He served under General David Twiggs at New Orleans and commanded a brigade of infantry while helping plan the defenses of the city. On April 11, 1862, Smith was promoted to brigadier general and transferred back to the engineers. In May, he took charge of constructing the defenses of Vicksburg, Mississippi, as well as leading a division. Indeed, the multi-volume Official History of the Civil War, entitled War of the Rebellion, credits 'Brigadier General M.L. Smith' with giving the Official Confederate Response to the Union's May 18, 1862 demand that Vicksburg surrender to the Union. After the town finally fell in July 1863, he was captured and was held as a prisoner of war for seven months.

He was exchanged in early 1864 and briefly was the head of the Engineer Corps for the entire Confederate Army from March until April, when he became the chief engineer for the Army of Northern Virginia. Later, he held the same position for the Army of Tennessee. As chief engineer of the Department of Alabama, Mississippi, and East Louisiana at the end of the war, he prepared the defenses of Mobile, Alabama, under the command of P.G.T. Beauregard. He remained in Mobile until the city fell to Union forces, and then returned home to Athens, where he surrendered in May 1865.

== Postbellum life ==
Smith moved to Savannah, Georgia, soon after the war ended and established a civil engineering company. He died less than a year later. At the time of his death, he was chief engineer of the railroad system that linked Selma, Alabama, with Dalton, Georgia (the Selma, Rome and Dalton Railroad). He is buried in Oconee Hill Cemetery in Athens, Georgia.

A bust of General Smith stands at the Vicksburg National Military Park. It was sculpted in 1911 by Henry Hudson Kitson.

== See also ==
- List of American Civil War generals (Confederate)
