= Tyringham Cobble =

Open-space reservation in Tyringham, Massachusetts, U.S.

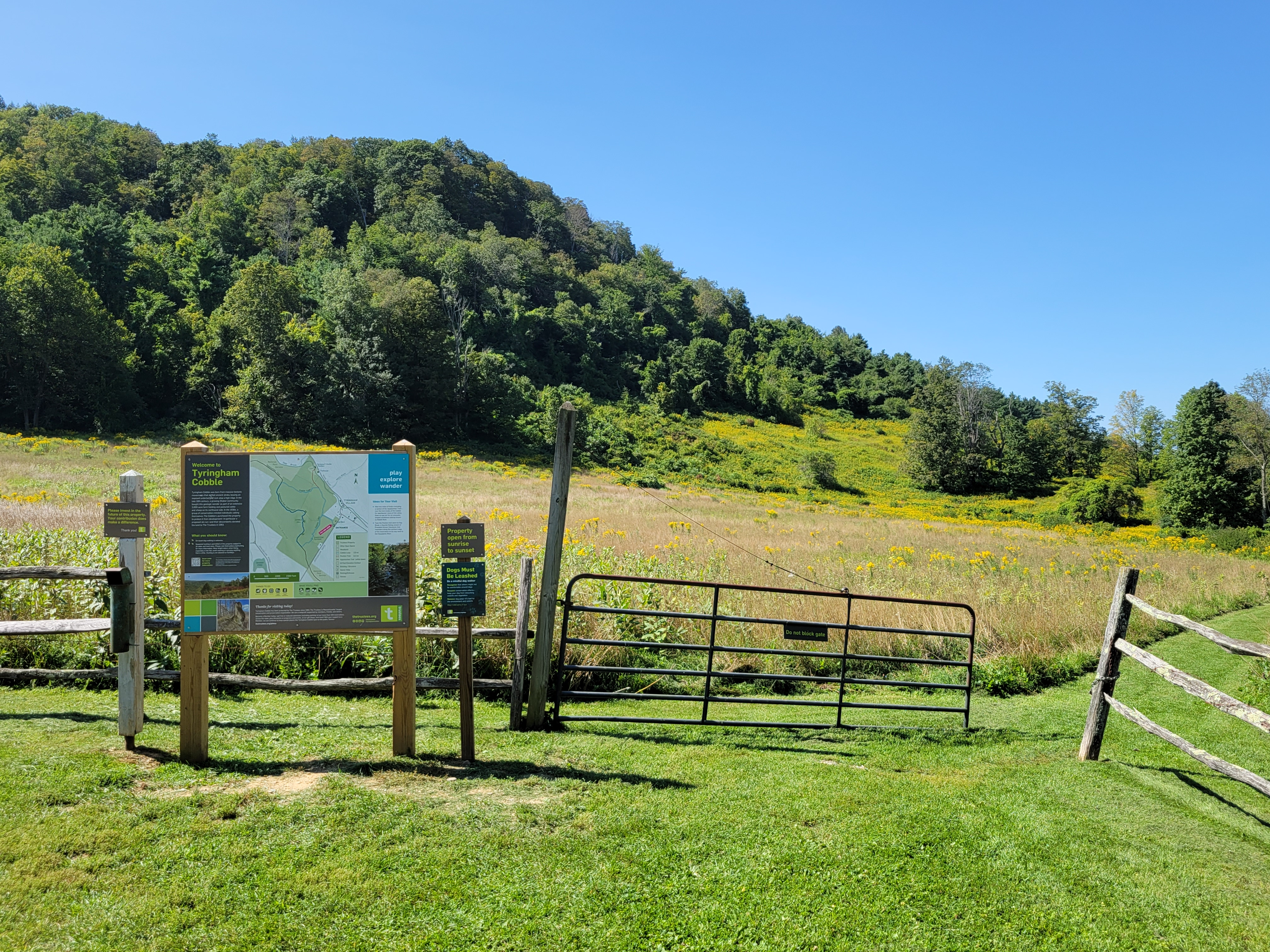
- Tyringham Cobble (2023)
- Interactive map of Tyringham Cobble
- Location: Tyringham, Massachusetts , U.S.
- Coordinates: 42°14′42″N 73°12′33″W
- Elevation: 411 m (1,348 ft)
- Designation: Open-space reservation
- Established: 1963 (63 years ago)
- Operator: The Trustees of Reservations
- Website: Tyringham Cobble

The Tyringham Cobble is a 206-acre (83 ha) open-space reservation, located in Tyringham, Massachusetts, United States, on 411 m (1,348 ft) Cobble Hill in The Berkshires.

It is managed by The Trustees of Reservations, a non-profit conservation organization, and is notable for its scenic views over the rural landscape of Tyringham Valley from rocky ledges and open fields. The reservation consists of the hill and surrounding agricultural and pasture land. In 2008, part of the 2,175-mile (3,500-km) Appalachian Trail was routed over the summit ledges.

== History ==
Cobble, derived from the German word kobel or koble, is usually applied to small, rocky, rounded and exposed hills.

Cobble Hill belongs to the largest pre-Cambrian geologic territory in Massachusetts. Studies of the hill by geologist Daniel Clark in 1895 showed that rock strata on the bottom of the hill was younger than strata on the top, leading him to conclude, incorrectly, that the hill had "broken off a nearby mountain and flipped over during a great geological cataclysm 500 million years ago". The actual mechanism was thrust-faulting, an orogenic process by which the collision of tectonic plates results in the shoving up and over of older rock layers atop younger layers. Specimens from Clark's research are now part of the stone work above the fireplace of the Tyringham Public Library and the Berkshire Museum in Pittsfield, Massachusetts.

In the early 19th century, Cobble Hill was largely cleared of forests to make room for agriculture and pasture by Shaker settlers. The property remained in agricultural use after the Shakers had departed, until the 1930s when Olivia Cutting James and a group of friends purchased parcels on the hill and surrounding pastures to protect it from development, partly in response to a proposed ski area. James's group called themselves "The Cobblers", and they created an informal association of tenants in common. James left the property to The Trustees of Reservations in 1961; other members of her group donated their holdings in 1963.

== Recreation ==
A trailhead parking lot is located on Jerusalem Road in Tyringham center. The trail system consists of a summit loop trail and the Appalachian Trail, which passes over the summit from northwest to southeast. Prior to 2008, the Appalachian Trail had passed through the west side of the reservation without ascending the summit. A natural sandstone monolith resembling a rabbit is located on the south side of Cobble Hill. Open hay fields ascend the east foot of the hill.

The reservation is open to hiking, picnicking, and cross-country skiing.

== See also ==
- Geography of Massachusetts
- List of nature centers in Massachusetts
- Nature reserve
