= May Kitson =

American actress during the silent film era

- Born: Mary Ann Morrell; October 29, 1866; London, England
- Died: June 17, 1945 (aged 78); San Diego, California
- Years active: 1917–1925
- Spouse: John William Kitson (m. 1882; died 1888) Unknown (m. 1896–1896) William J. Swan (died 1909)
- Children: 2

May Kitson (born Mary Ann Morrell, October 29, 1866 – June 17, 1945), was a British-born American silent film character actor active between 1917 and 1925.

== Family ==
Kitson was born in London, England, to Tom and Elizabeth (née Chandler) Morrell. Her family moved to New Jersey, United States in 1873 after her father's death.

May and John William Kitson were married in 1882 and their first child Howard Waldo was born in March 1883; a daughter Velma May followed in 1887. Kitson was widowed in February 1888. Robert Ellin and Kitson were co-executors of Kitson's estate. Her husband's firm, Ellin & Kitson, was changed to Ellin, Kitson & Company. JW Kitson Estate became a silent partner until the children reached maturity.

She was widowed again following a brief marriage in 1896. Her third husband, William J. Swan, also predeceased her, dying around 1909. She applied to the NY Court to change her name back to Mary Kitson. In 1920 she applied for a United States passport. In November 1914, her son Waldo married Lela Cole, a short story writer of western romances. In 1910 her daughter Velma married Commodore Byron McCandless, a 1905 Naval Academy graduate.

== Death ==
Kitson died on June 17, 1945, at the U.S. Naval Repair Base, in San Diego, California, at her daughter's home, the Commanding Officer's Quarters. Her ashes are near her son Waldo's in Hollywood Forever Cemetery, Los Angeles formerly The Hollywood Cemetery, located opposite Paramount Studios, not to be confused with the one on the east coast.

== Filmography ==
- The Firing Line (1919) Constance Paliser
- Come Out of the Kitchen (1919) Mrs. Daingerfield
- The Burning Question (1919)
- The Woman God Sent (1920)
- Father Tom (1921) Mary
- The Family Closet (1921) Mrs. Dinsmore
- Flesh and Spirit (1922) Mrs. Wallace
- Other Women's Clothes (1922) Mrs. Roger Montayne
- The New School Teacher (1924) Mrs. Buck
