= Ashintully Gardens =

Estate in Tyringham, Massachusetts

Coordinates: 42°12′55.09″N 73°10′38.12″W

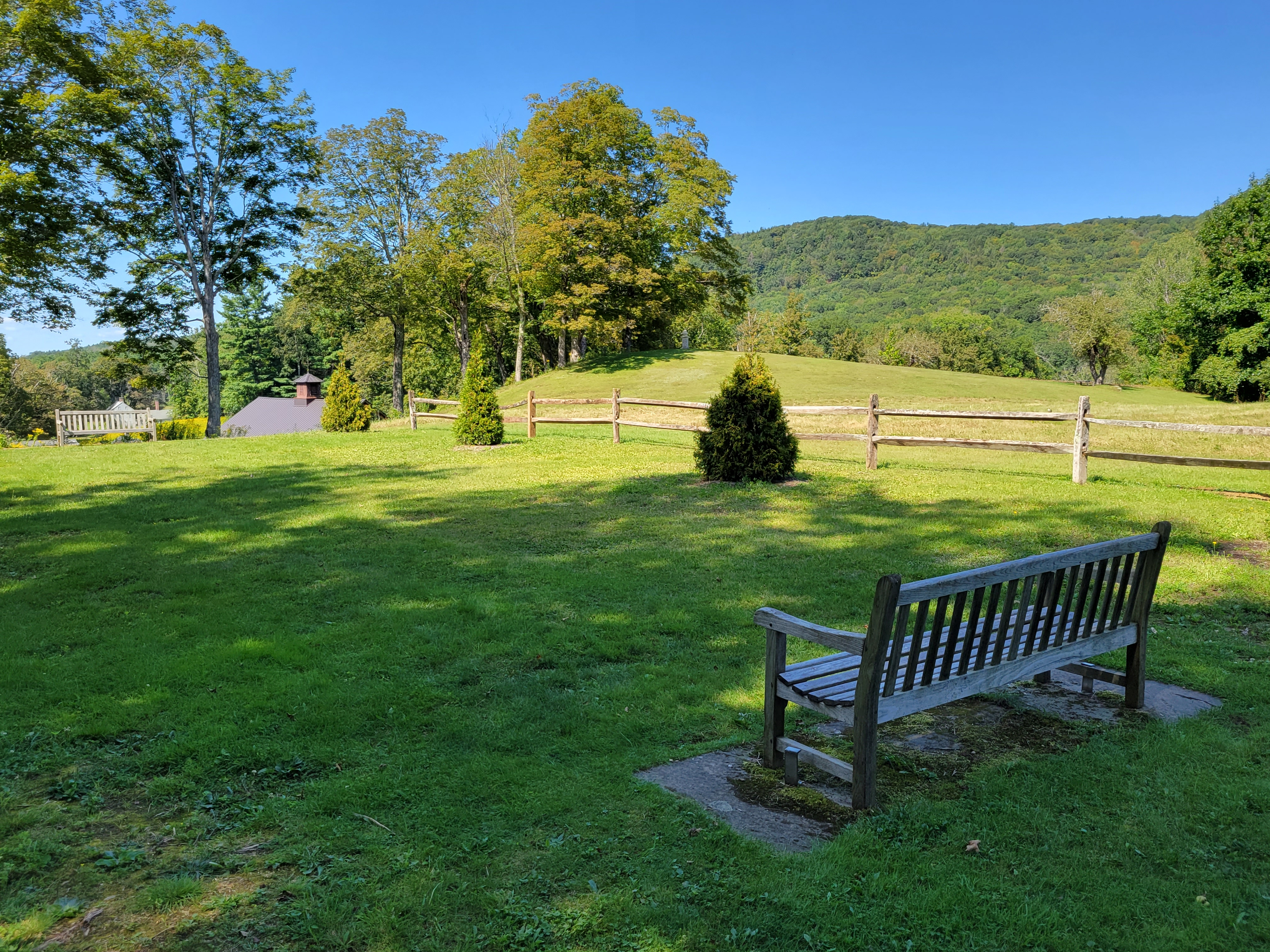
Bowling green

Ashintully Gardens is a 120 acre (0.5 km^{2}) estate in Tyringham, Massachusetts that is maintained by The Trustees of Reservations land trust. The gardens, and the adjoining 594 acres (2.4 km^{2}) McLennan Reservation, were the gift of John Stewart McLennan Jr., and his wife Katharine. The name Ashintully comes from Gaelic Eas an Tulaich and means "cascade of the hillock".

== Description ==
The gardens blend several natural features into an ordered arrangement with both formal and informal beauty. These include a rushing stream, native deciduous trees, a rounded knoll, and flanking meadows.

Garden features include the Fountain Pond, Pine Park, Rams Head Terrace, Bowling Green, Regency Bridge, and Trellis Triptych. Urns, columns, and statuary provide ornamentation. Footpaths, bridges, stone stairs, and grassy terraces connect various parts of the garden.

In 1997, Ashintully Gardens received the Massachusetts Horticultural Society's H. Hollis Hunnewell Medal', a prize established to recognize gardens embellished with rare and desirable ornamental trees and shrubs.

== History ==
Ashintully Gardens came about through the efforts of two men: Robb de Peyster Tytus and John S. McLennan Jr.

=== Robb de Peyster Tytus ===
In the early 20th century, Egyptologist and politician Robb de Peyster Tytus assembled the estate from the merger of three farms in Tyringham and additional land in Otis. The land holdings of the estate with the three farms grew to almost 1,000 acres (4 km^{2}).

On a hill overlooking the southern end of Tyringham Valley, Tytus built between 1910 - 1912 a white, Georgian-style mansion which came to be known as the Marble Palace. The mansion's main façade featured four Doric columns and was spanned by thirteen bay windows. Its interior contained thirty-five rooms, ten baths, and fifteen fireplaces.

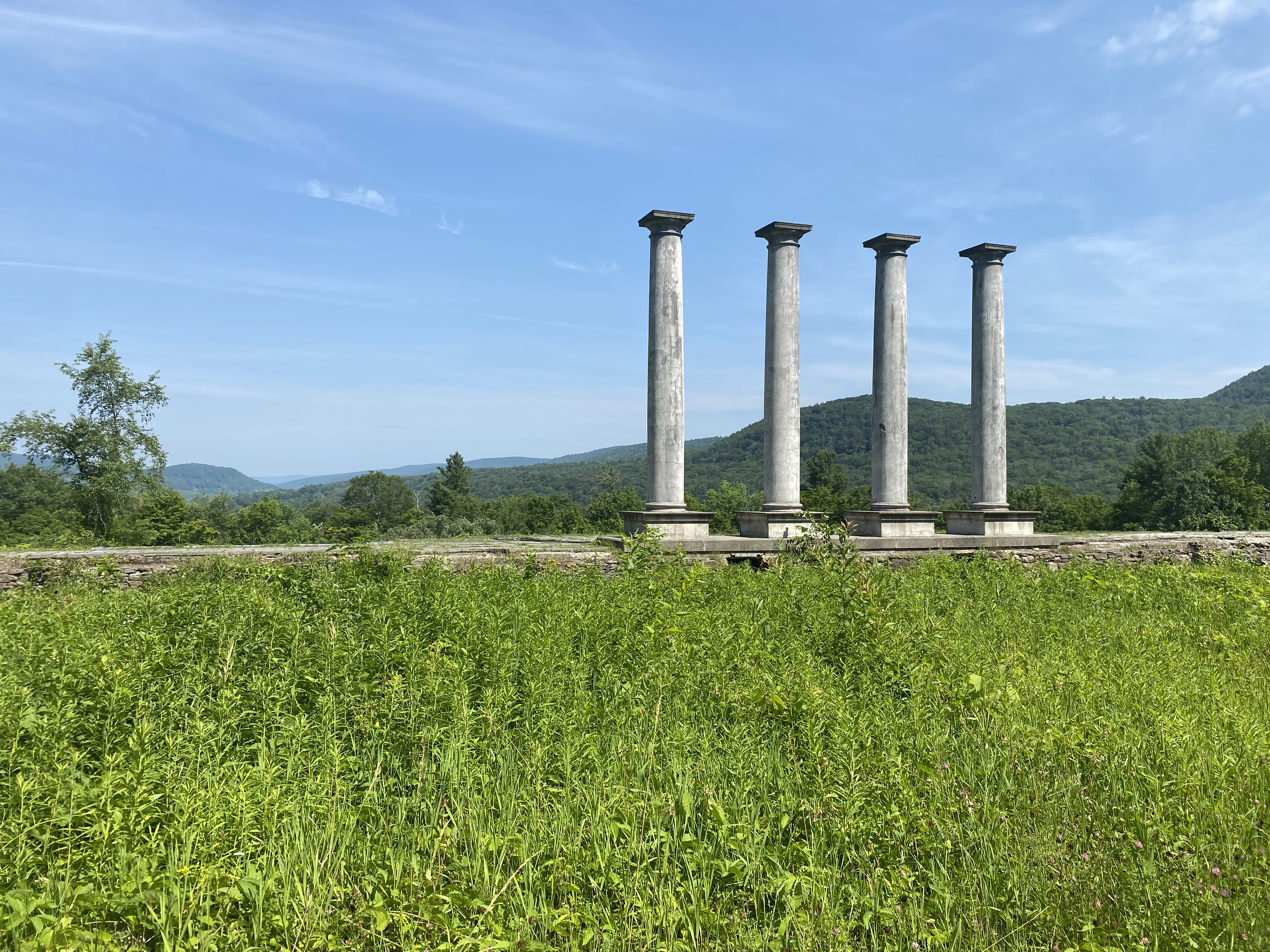
Doric columns at Ashintully, summer 2025

Though the Marble Palace was destroyed by fire in 1952, the front terrace, foundation, and four Doric columns remain today.

In 1913, Tytus died at Saranac Lake, New York, leaving his wife, Grace Henoys Tytus, and two daughters, Mildred and Victoria.

=== John Stewart McLennan Jr. ===
A year after Tytus' death, his widow married John Stewart McLennan, a Canadian industrialist and newspaper owner, and later Senator. She gave birth, in 1915, to John Jr., before subsequently being divorced.

John S. McLennan Jr. spent all his childhood summers at the Tytus estate, and acquired the property in 1937, following the death of his mother. He later moved into the farmhouse at the bottom of the hill, and renovated the nearby barn into a music studio. McLennan was an accomplished composer of contemporary classical music, including chamber and orchestral music and pieces for piano and organ. (In 1985 he won an American Academy of Arts and Letters music award.) He designed the elegant gardens as a parallel creative effort to his musical work,. In 1977 John began donating sections of the Ashintully estate to The Trustees of Reservations, although, he continued to live at the estate for the rest of his life.

Shortly before his death, in 1996, John and his wife Katharine donated additional land to the Trustees. The land, including the Marble Palace ruins, the farmhouse, and Ashintully Gardens, was donated with a reserved life estate for Katharine McLennan. Initially, 18 acres (73,000 m^{2}) were reserved for Katharine; she donated 12 acres (49,000 m^{2}) to the Trustees in 2003, retaining 6 acres (24,000 m^{2}) with garden access, upon which her cottage resides.

After her death in 2017, the title for the remaining land was turned over to the Trustees.

The Gardens and John McLennan's life were profiled in a 2007 episode of the GardenStory series, presented by Community Idea Stations of Virginia, and broadcast nationally on American Public Television.

== McLennan Reservation ==
Adjoining the Ashintully Gardens are parts of the remnants of the vast 1,000 acres (4 km^{2}) assembled by Robb de Peyster Tytus.

John McLennan Jr. in 1977, in addition to his garden donation to the Trustees, donated 446 acres (1.8 km^{2}) of the estate in Otis and Tyringham to establish the McLennan Reservation. The reservation was expanded in 1978, 1991 and 1995 by a total of 148 acres (0.6 km^{2}), bringing the McLennan Reservation to 594 acres (2.4 km^{2}).
