= Statue of David Farragut (Boston) =

Statue in Boston, Massachusetts, U.S.

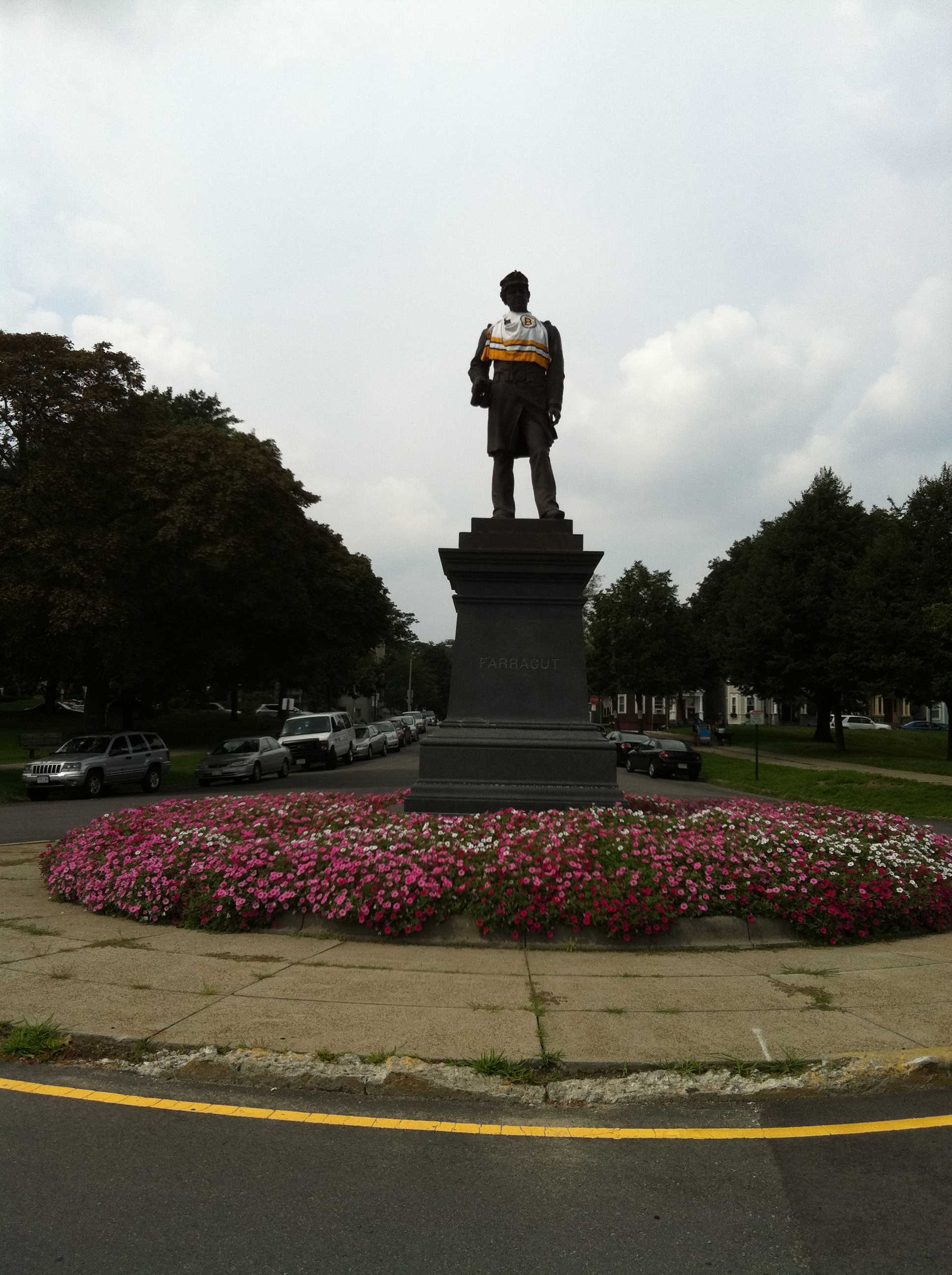
- Statue of David Farragut
- Artist: Henry Hudson Kitson
- Year: 1891
- Subject: David Farragut
- Location: Marine Park, Boston; 42°20′9″N 71°1′26.4″W

A statue of David Farragut by Henry Hudson Kitson is installed in Boston's Marine Park, in the U.S. state of Massachusetts. The sculpture was cast in 1891. It was surveyed by the Smithsonian Institution's "Save Outdoor Sculpture!" program in 1997.

== See also ==
- 1891 in art
