= Samuel James Kitson =

British-American sculptor

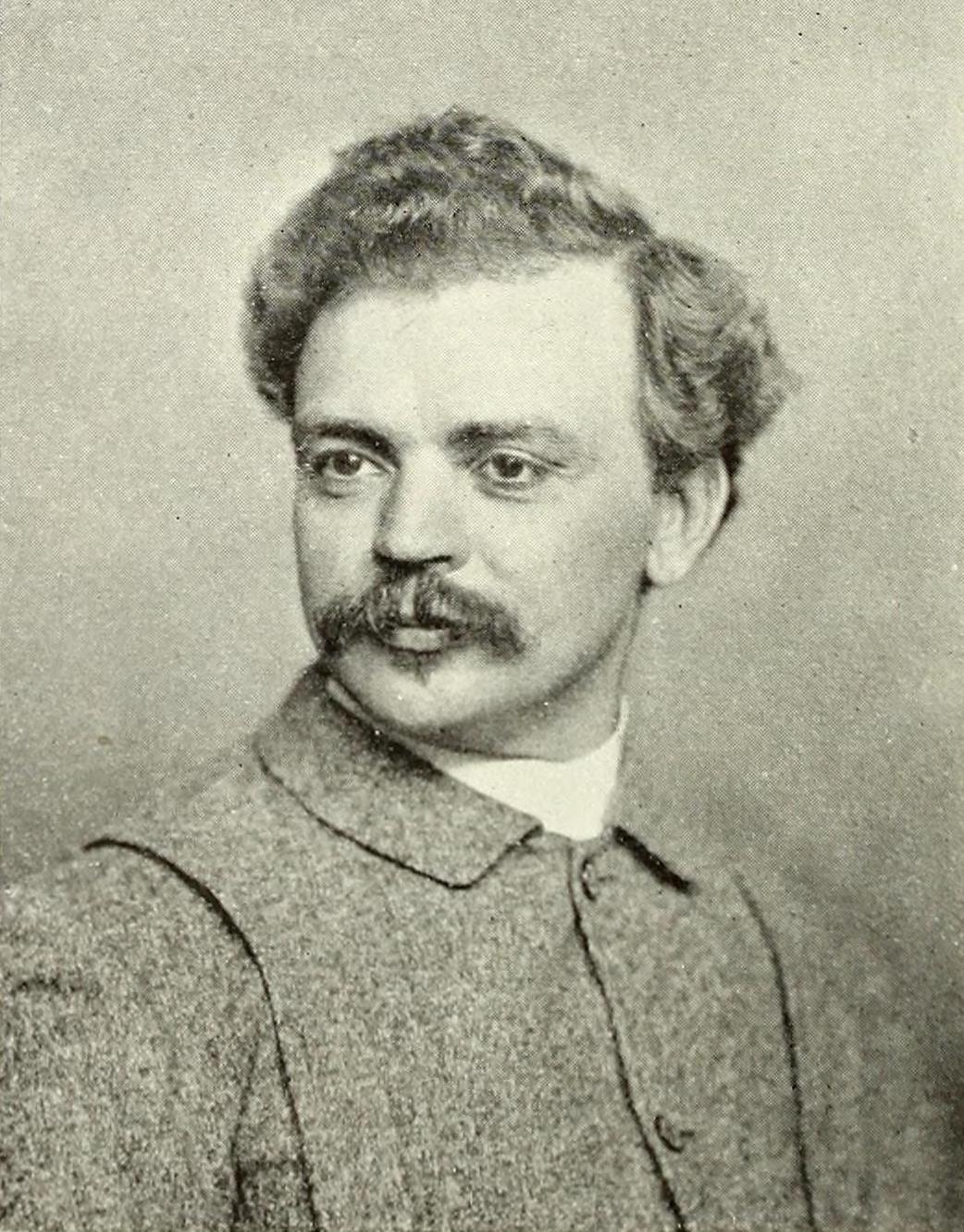
- Kitson c. 1892, in a publication issued for the World's Columbian Exposition
- Born: January 1, 1848; Huddersfield, Yorkshire, England
- Died: November 9, 1906 (aged 58); New York City, New York, United States
- Education: Accademia di San Luca
- Style: Neoclassical
- Spouse: Anne Meredith Kitson (m. 1884)
- Family: John William Kitson (brother); Henry Hudson Kitson (brother)

Samuel James Kitson (January 1, 1848 – November 9, 1906) was a British-American sculptor active in the United States from about 1876 to 1906. He maintained studios in New York City and Boston.

Many of his works were religious in nature, and he also completed a number of busts of prominent Americans. His work, mostly in marble, consisted of full-body statues, head and shoulder portraits, and friezes.

After the death of his older brother John William Kitson, he became more active in his Boston studio where his younger brother Henry Hudson Kitson joined him.

== Early life and education ==
Kitson was born in Huddersfield, West Yorkshire, England, on January 1, 1848. His brothers were John William Kitson and Henry Hudson Kitson, who both became sculptors.

He studied at the Accademia di San Luca in Rome from 1870 to 1873 and received an award for his sculpture there. After completing his studies, in the mid-1870s he established a studio in Italy. He remained in Rome for ten years.

== Career ==
In 1878, Kitson spent about one year in both New York and Boston, where he began to receive private commissions. His first commission was a full bust of Ole Bull whose Boston home was next door to that of Henry Wadsworth Longfellow. Kitson returned to his Italian studio to complete these commissioned works in marble.

In 1881 he returned the United States, whereupon he was commissioned to execute statuary and architectural elements for the William K. Vanderbilt House. He moved to the United States permanently that year.

Prior to moving permanently to the United States, Kitson continued exhibiting in England. His works Rebecca at the Well (1874) and Isaac (1875) were exhibited at the Royal Manchester Institution. Between 1877 and 1880, Kitson exhibited three times at the Royal Academy of Arts.

Kitson became a naturalized American in 1893. He married Anne Meredith Kitson, originally of Waltham, Massachusetts, in 1884.

Kitson was a convert to Catholicism.

He died on November 9, 1906, in New York City. As of his death, he lived at 23 West 67th Street, in Manhattan's Lincoln Square neighborhood.

== Works ==
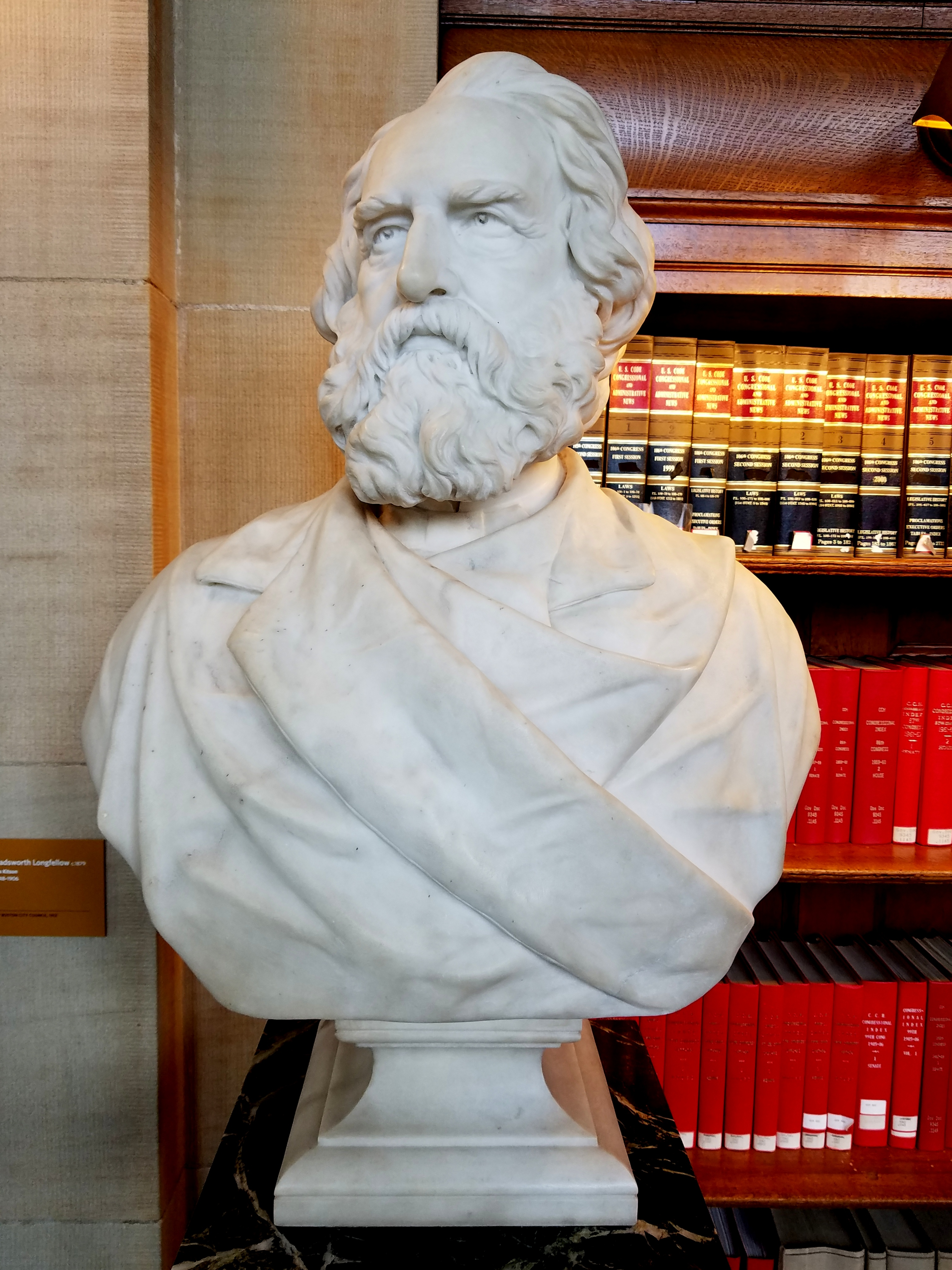
Bust of Henry Wadsworth Longfellow (1879).

While most of Kitson's work was not as public as his younger brother Henry Hudson Kitson it is quite extensive. Some of his works are as follows:

- Most of the statuary of the William K. Vanderbilt House, New York City
- North frieze of the Soldiers and Sailors Memorial Arch, Bushnell Park, Hartford, Connecticut
- Bust of Henry Wadsworth Longfellow (1879), located at the Longfellow House–Washington's Headquarters National Historic Site
- Bust of Phillip Sheridan, located just below Arlington House in Arlington National Cemetery
- Bust of Frederic T. Greenhalge (1895)
- Bronze bust of Orestes Brownson (c. 1910), now located at Fordham University
- Christ, the Light of the World (c. 1922) presented by cardinal John Murphy Farley to St. Joseph's Seminary, in memory of archbishop Joseph M. Corrigan
