= Robert Ellin =

American sculptor

Robert Ellin (1837–1904) was an English-born American stone and wood sculptor.

Ellin was born December 21, 1837, in Yorkshire, England. He was active in the United States 1867 to 1904. Not much is known about his life prior to his association with a fellow Yorkshireman John William Kitson. Together they entered a mahogany breakfront in the 1876 centential juried event in which they won.

Robert Ellin established his firm as Robert Ellin & Co. circa 1870 in New York City. He and John William Kitson joined forces in 1874 as Robert Ellin and Company. In 1879 they formally changed the firm's name to Ellin & Kitson. Following the death of William Kitson in February 1888, the name of the firm was changed to Ellin, Kitson and Company. The Estate of John William Kitson became a silent partner until the estate sale of the business in 1904.

Ellin is mentioned in A History of the Metropolitan Museum of Art 1913 by Howe and Kent.

Robert Ellin was the promoter of his firm. In order to control costs he became involved in many mining and other supplies businesses. In 1872 Robert Ellin was elected as a director for the Bay of Fundy Red Granite Company located in St. George, New Brunswick, Canada; Perth Amboy Terra Cotta Works; 1893 The Goodsell Marble Company Newark NJ.

He was active in establishing the Metropolitan Museum of Art and was an officer of the Sculpture Society covering stone.

In July 1874 he filed for the trademark Terra-Cotta in the Great Britain Patent Office. In 1899 Ellin filed for a U.S. patent for crushing/grinding mill, which was awarded to him in May 1900 as #650,798. He is also noted to have carved the cherry frieze in Old South Church in Boston, Massachusetts between 1872 and 1875. They have been noted as specialty contractors in many buildings from New York City to Boston.

In 1900 census he is noted to be living in Westchester, New York. He died February 3, 1904, in Yonkers, New York. At the time of his death, Ellin, Kitson & Co were working on Senator William A. Clark's New York City home.

Ellin & Kitson worked with many notable architects and designers of the day: Thomas Wisedell, J C Cady, Robert J Withers, Vaux/ Withers, George B. Post, Kimball & Wisedell, Frederick Law Olmsted, and Richard Hunt among them.
