= Tyringham, Massachusetts =

- Town
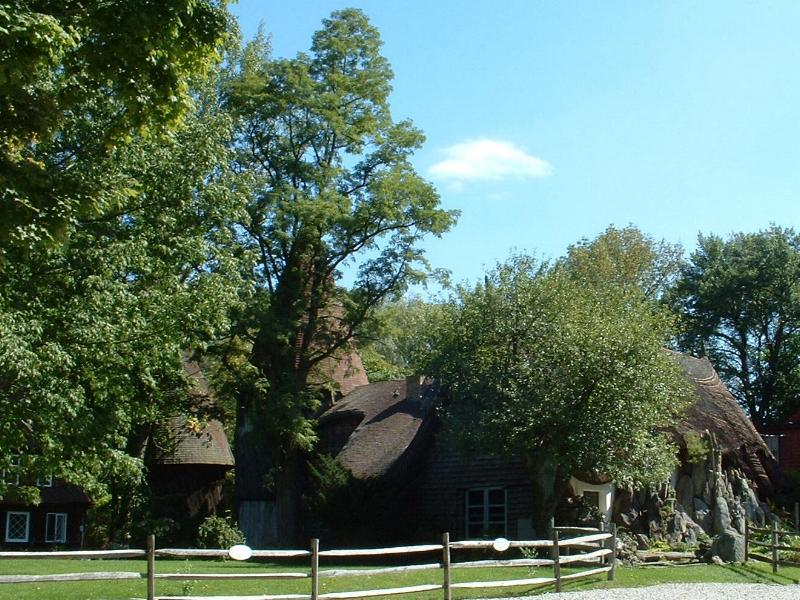
- Santarella, the home of Henry Hudson Kitson

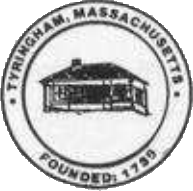
- Seal

- Location in Berkshire County and the state of Massachusetts.
- Coordinates: 42°14′45″N 73°12′15″W
- Country: United States
- State: Massachusetts
- County: Berkshire
- Settled: 1735
- Incorporated: 1762

Government
  - Type: Open town meeting
  - Town administrator: Molly Curtin-Schaefer

Area
  - Total: 18.9 sq mi (48.9 km^{2})
  - Land: 18.6 sq mi (48.3 km^{2})
  - Water: 0.23 sq mi (0.6 km^{2})
- Elevation: 902 ft (275 m)

Population (2020)
  - Total: 427
  - Density: 22.9/sq mi (8.84/km^{2})
- Time zone: UTC-5 (Eastern)
  - Summer (DST): UTC-4 (Eastern)
- ZIP Codes: 01264 (Tyringham); 01238 (Lee)
- Area code: 413
- FIPS code: 25-71095
- GNIS feature ID: 0619429
- Website: www.tyringham-ma.gov

Tyringham is a town in Berkshire County, Massachusetts, United States. It is part of the Pittsfield, Massachusetts Metropolitan Statistical Area. The population was 427 at the 2020 census.

== History ==
Founded as Housatonic Township Number 1, the land which became Tyringham and Monterey was first settled in 1735. Tyringham was established in 1739. The two main villages were set up along two waterways, Hop Brook to the north and the Konkapot River to the south.

In 1750, Adonijah Bidwell, a Yale Divinity School graduate from the Hartford region, became the first minister of Township No. 1. When a meetinghouse was founded in the south, it led to a buildup in the north, and by 1762 the town was incorporated. The origins of the town name are somewhat disputed, with some sources claiming it was named for Tyringham, a village in Buckinghamshire, England, and others asserting it was named by Sir Francis Bernard, the former governor of the Massachusetts Bay Colony, after a woman, Jane Beresford (adopted by John Tyringham), from whom he had inherited an estate. If the latter, it would be one of the few towns in Massachusetts named after a woman, along with Abington, Dighton and Lanesborough.

The town was home to the Tyringham Shaker Settlement Historic District, with the Shaker holy name of "Jerusalem", which lay just south of the town center. The town of Monterey was set off and incorporated as its own town in 1847.

Tyringham celebrated its bicentennial in August 1939 with a two-day celebration and a 31 unit parade.

The Stedman Rake Factory located in town made rakes for several American Presidents, including Theodore Roosevelt, William Howard Taft, Warren G. Harding, Calvin Coolidge, and Herbert Hoover.

The town was the site of several small country estates for notable wealthy families. Today, Tyringham is a small, rural community.

=== Economy ===
The town of Tyringham began with an agricultural economy which soon shifted to include cottage industries and manufacturing. In 1786, the town had 182 dwelling houses, forty shops, two tanneries, four potash works, two iron works, and four grist and saw mills. The townspeople made 1185 barrels of cider that year. More than ten thousand acres of the uplands were woodlands or unimproved land, but about 2500 acres had been improved for tillage. About two thousand acres were mowed for hay, and more than three thousand acres were used as pasturage for the townspeople's five hundred horses, eight hundred swine, 178 oxen, five hundred cattle, and 541 milk cows.

By 1837, Tyringham farmers had incorporated sheep into their economy and owned 1678 Merino sheep as well as 598 sheep of other breeds, and produced more than 6500 pounds of wool. One tannery was still in operation. Their manufactories made boots, shoes, iron castings, forks, wooden ware, palm-leaf hats, rakes, chairs, and corn brooms. The biggest business, a paper mill, employed seven men and nineteen women, and made fifty tons of paper valued at $21,000.

Manufacturing continued to grow. The Shakers' rake factory employed nine men and made thirty thousand rakes in 1865. Two paper mills employing 22 men and 41 women made more than $110,000 worth of paper. In addition, Tyringham townspeople worked in two blacksmith shops, a boot and shoe factory, and five sawmills. After the Tyringham Shakers left in 1875, their businesses closed and their farms were sold. One Shaker family's buildings on Jerusalem Road became a summer resort known as Fernside.

== Geography ==
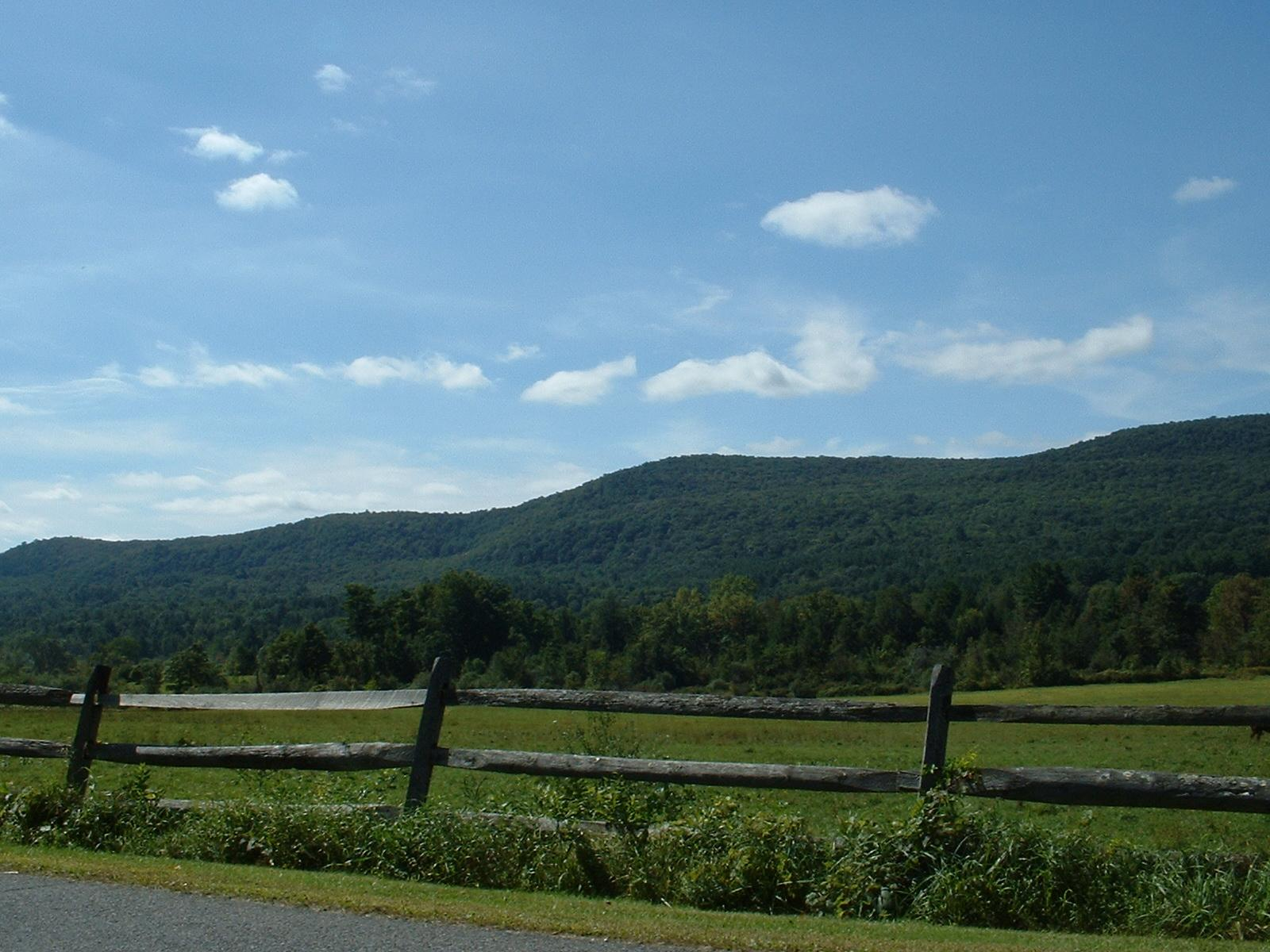
The hills to the south of Tyringham, as seen from Main Road

According to the United States Census Bureau, the town has a total area of 18.9 square miles (48.9 km^{2}), of which 18.6 square miles (48.3 km^{2}) is land and 0.23 square miles (0.6 km^{2}), or 1.20%, is water. The town is four-sided, bordered by Lee to the north, Becket and Otis to the east, Monterey to the south, and Great Barrington to the west. Tyringham is located 16 miles (26 km) south of Pittsfield, 39 miles (63 km) west-northwest of Springfield, and 125 miles (201 km) west of Boston.

Tyringham is located in the Hop Brook Valley in the Berkshire Hills. To the northeast of the valley, Baldy Mountain rises to a large plateau which stretches into the neighboring towns, and includes Goose Pond. To the southwest of the valley, two mountain peaks—Mount Wilcot and Hunger Mountain—rise in a plateau in neighboring Monterey.

=== Appalachian Trail ===
The Appalachian Trail passes through the town, a reflection of its remoteness. It winds down Sky Hill (a part of Mount Wilcot), then sweeps through the valley along Main Road, past the town center, leaving via Baldy Mountain and towards Becket Mountain. A pay telephone station for the hikers was installed near the Post Office. Informally, some residents on Main Road provide bed and breakfast, and hot showers, to hikers.

== Climate ==
In a typical year, Tyringham, Massachusetts temperatures fall below 50 °F (10 °C) for 205 days per year. Annual precipitation is typically 46.3 inches per year (high in the US) and snow covers the ground 69 days per year or 18.9% of the year (high in the US). It may be helpful to understand the yearly precipitation by imagining 9 straight days of moderate rain per year. The humidity is below 60% for approximately 18.4 days or 5.0% of the year.

== Demographics ==
Historical population
Year	Pop.	±%
1790	1,397	—
1850	821	−41.2%
1860	730	−11.1%
1870	557	−23.7%
1880	542	−2.7%
1890	412	−24.0%
1900	386	−6.3%
1910	382	−1.0%
1920	267	−30.1%
1930	246	−7.9%
1940	213	−13.4%
1950	235	+10.3%
1960	197	−16.2%
1970	234	+18.8%
1980	344	+47.0%
1990	369	+7.3%
2000	350	−5.1%
2010	327	−6.6%
2020	427	+30.6%
2024*	419	−1.9%
* = population estimate. Source: United States census records and Population Estimates Program data.

As of the census of 2000, there were 350 people, 133 households, and 98 families residing in the town. By population, the town ranks 30th out of 32 cities and towns in Berkshire County, and 345th out of the 351 in Massachusetts. The population density was 18.7 people per square mile (7.2/km^{2}), which ranks 28th in the county and 342nd in the Commonwealth. There were 265 housing units at an average density of 14.2 per square mile (5.5/km^{2}). The racial makeup of the town was 95.43% White, 0.29% African American, 0.29% Native American, 2.57% Asian, and 1.43% from two or more races. Hispanic or Latino of any race were 0.29% of the population.

There were 133 households, out of which 24.1% had children under the age of 18 living with them, 66.2% were married couples living together, 6.0% had a female householder with no husband present, and 25.6% were non-families. 20.3% of all households were made up of individuals, and 9.0% had someone living alone who was 65 years of age or older. The average household size was 2.56 and the average family size was 2.93.

In the town, the population was spread out, with 18.6% under the age of 18, 6.6% from 18 to 24, 18.9% from 25 to 44, 40.6% from 45 to 64, and 15.4% who were 65 years of age or older. The median age was 48 years. For every 100 females, there were 101.1 males. For every 100 females age 18 and over, there were 103.6 males.

The median income for a household in the town was $60,250, and the median income for a family was $67,679. Males had a median income of $42,708 versus $31,250 for females. The per capita income for the town was $35,503. None of the families and 3.5% of the population were living below the poverty line, including no under eighteens and none of those over 64.

== Government ==
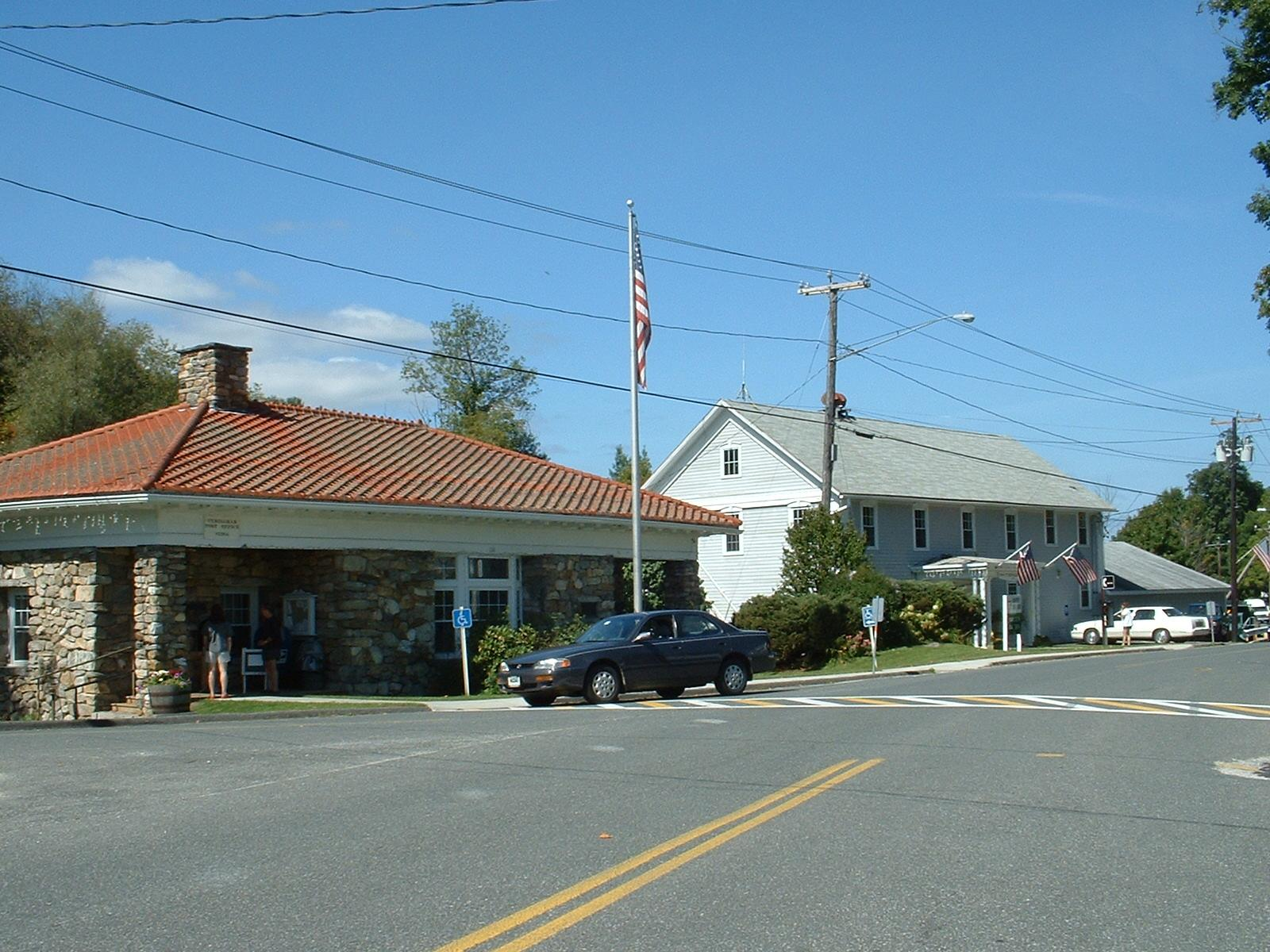
Tyringham Post Office and Town Hall

Tyringham uses the open town meeting form of government, and is led by a board of selectmen and an administrative assistant. The town has a police department, fire department and post office, as well as a library, which is adjacent to the town hall and is part of the regional library network. The nearest courthouses and hospital, Fairview Hospital, are located in Great Barrington.

On the state level, Tyringham is represented in the Massachusetts House of Representatives by the Fourth Berkshire district, which covers southern Berkshire County, as well as the westernmost towns in Hampden County. In the Massachusetts Senate, the town is represented by the Berkshire, Hampshire and Franklin district, which includes all of Berkshire County and western Hampshire and Franklin counties. The town is patrolled by the First (Lee) Station of Barracks "B" of the Massachusetts State Police.

On the national level, Tyringham is represented in the United States House of Representatives as part of Massachusetts's 1st congressional district, and has been represented by Richard Neal of Springfield since January 2013. Massachusetts is currently represented in the United States Senate by senior Senator Elizabeth Warren and junior Senator Ed Markey

Tyringham presidential election results
Year	Democratic	Republican	Third parties	Total Votes	Margin
2020	75.24% 234	23.15% 72	1.61% 5	311	52.09%
2016	68.60% 201	23.89% 70	7.51% 22	293	44.71%
2012	67.05% 173	32.95% 85	0.00% 0	258	34.11%
2008	70.55% 194	28.73% 79	0.73% 2	275	41.82%
2004	65.15% 172	34.85% 92	0.00% 0	264	30.30%
2000	47.66% 102	43.46% 93	8.88% 19	214	4.21%
1996	56.46% 118	31.58% 66	11.96% 25	209	24.88%
1992	59.62% 127	23.94% 51	16.43% 35	213	35.68%
1988	62.50% 130	37.50% 78	0.00% 0	208	25.00%
1984	43.98% 84	56.02% 107	0.00% 0	191	12.04%
1980	40.69% 83	44.12% 90	15.20% 31	204	3.43%
1976	51.61% 96	45.70% 85	2.69% 5	186	5.91%
1972	46.25% 74	53.13% 85	0.63% 1	160	6.88%
1968	47.45% 65	48.18% 66	4.38% 6	137	0.73%
1964	68.33% 82	31.67% 38	0.00% 0	120	36.67%
1960	43.22% 51	56.78% 67	0.00% 0	118	13.56%
1956	24.35% 28	75.65% 87	0.00% 0	115	51.30%
1952	31.40% 38	68.60% 83	0.00% 0	121	37.19%
1948	22.64% 24	74.53% 79	2.83% 3	106	51.89%
1944	40.38% 42	59.62% 62	0.00% 0	104	19.23%
1940	32.20% 38	66.95% 79	0.85% 1	118	34.75%

== Education ==
Tyringham students are sent to Lee Public Schools by arrangement with that adjacent town. Lee Elementary School serves students from pre-kindergarten through sixth grades, and the Lee Middle and High School serves students from seventh through twelfth grades. Additionally, neighboring Lee is home to Saint Mary's School, a parochial school which serves students through eighth grade. Other private schools can be found in Great Barrington and other surrounding towns.

== Points of interest ==
- Santarella, also called "The Gingerbread House", home of sculptor Henry Hudson Kitson
- Tyringham Shaker Settlement Historic District
- Ashintully Gardens
- Tyringham Cobble
- Titus Mansion Ruins

== Notable people ==
- Brooke Astor owned a home in Tyringham with her husband Buddie Marshall, selling it following his death and before she became Mrs. Astor.
- Grover Cleveland, U.S. President, spent time in Tyringham, enjoying fishing in the Hop Brook. In 1901, he was arrested and fined $2 for catching too many fish.
- Maria Cole, widow of Nat "King" Cole, moved to Tyringham five years after his death.
- Kitty Dukakis owned a home used as a vacation retreat for her husband, former governor Michael Dukakis.
- George Gilder, investor, writer, economist, techno-utopian advocate; spent most of his childhood with his mother, Anne Spring (Alsop), and his stepfather, Gilder Palmer, on a dairy farm in Tyringham, where he still lives.
- Rutherford B. Hayes, U. S. President; spent part of a summer in Tyringham, staying at a large house just to the north of the village that took in boarders, claiming their team met every train in Lee.
- Sidney Howard, playwright and screenwriter; lived and died in Tyringham. Howard was the major screenwriter for David O. Selznick's 1939 epic Gone with the Wind
- Yo-Yo Ma, Classical musician; has a residence in Tyringham and spends much of his time in the town.
- William Roerick, actor; lived at his Lost Farm homestead in Tyringham; among the various visitors was E. M. Forster, who dedicated his last book, Two Cheers for Democracy to "William Roerick and 'The Lost Farm' in Tyringham, Massachusetts."
- Mark Twain, writer; was a frequent visitor to Tyringham as the guest of Richard Watson Gilder and Helena de Kay Gilder. He spent a summer in Tyringham following the death of his daughter.
- Sir Brian Urquhart, British diplomat and United Nations official; lived and died in the town.
