= Lake Buel =

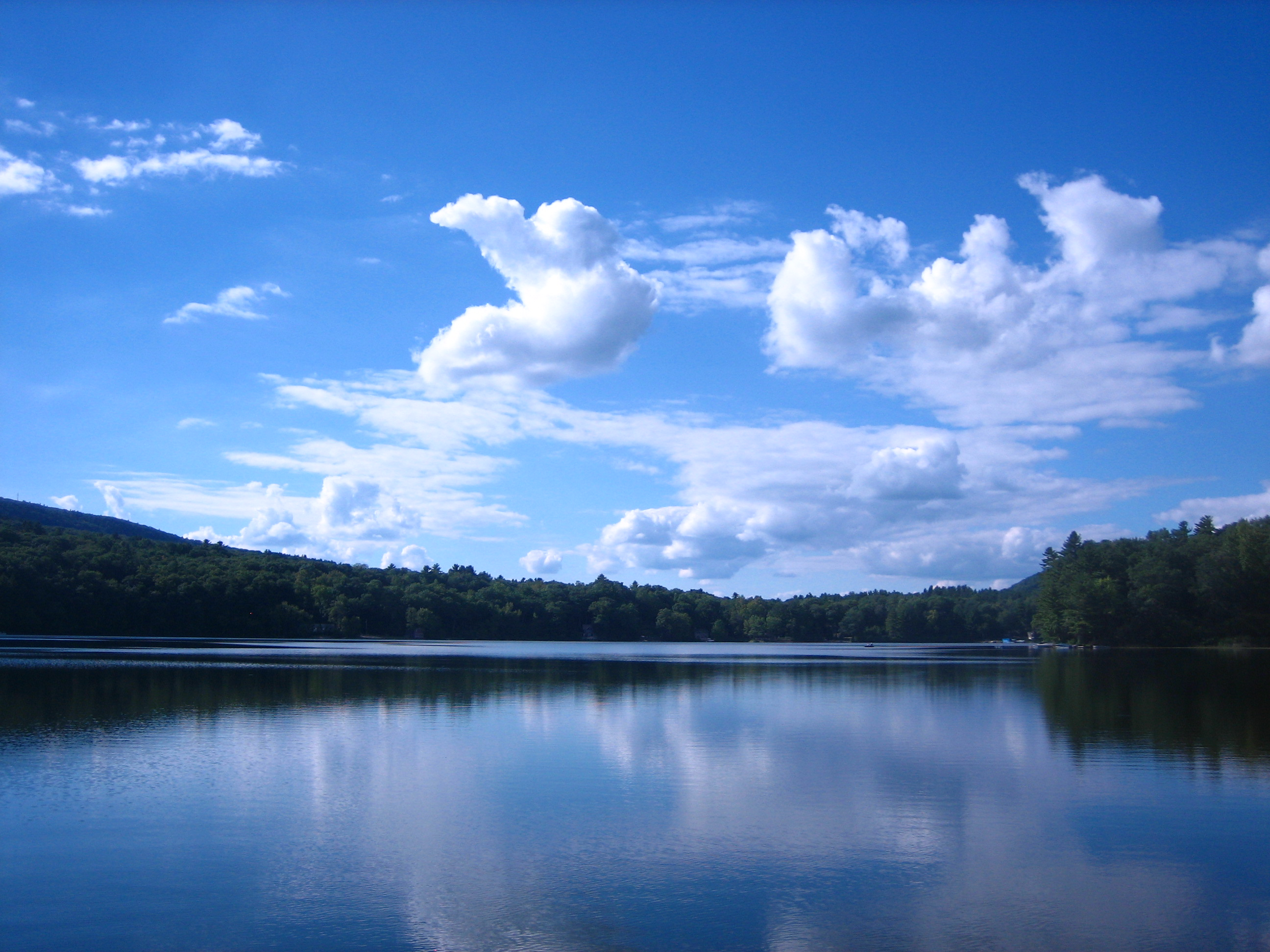
- September on the lake

- Location within Massachusetts Location within the United States
- Location: Monterey / New Marlborough, Berkshire County, Massachusetts, United States
- Coordinates: 42°10′10″N 73°16′30″W
- Type: lake
- Basin countries: United States
- Surface area: 196 acres (79 ha)
- Average depth: 20 ft (6.1 m)
- Max. depth: 42 ft (13 m)
- Surface elevation: 908 ft (277 m)
- Settlements: Monterey, New Marlboro

Lake Buel is a 196-acre (0.79 km^{2}) great pond in Berkshire County, Massachusetts just south of Route 57 and east of Great Barrington. It is surrounded by over one-hundred summer homes and a few dozen year-round homes in about a dozen separate, tight-knit neighborhoods, each with its own private or semi-private road. The roads do not interlink.

The lake is named after Samuel C. Buel of Tyringham, Massachusetts who saved people from drowning on the lake (called at the time Six Mile Pond) on July 23, 1812.

The northern shore of the lake is in the town of Monterey and the southern shore is in New Marlborough. There is a paved boat ramp on the northwest shore owned by the Public Access Board and managed by Forests and Parks and Fisheries and Game. A portion of the Appalachian Trail crosses over a breached mill dam along the northern inlet.

== Natural characteristics ==
The mean depth is 20 feet (6.1 m); the maximum depth is 42 feet (13 m). The Lake Buel watershed encompasses 3,268 acres (13.23 km^{2}). At times the Konkapot River Basin becomes part of this watershed. The lake's water is well-buffered and hard with a pH between 7.8 and 8.6. This hardness and alkalinity suggest that the lake generally safe from the effects of acid rain. The lake is eutrophic and mesotrophic: eutrophic because of macrophyte production and hypolimnetic metabolism; mestrophic because of total phosphorus content and summer phytoplankton productivity. The normal full water elevation of the lake is 908 feet (277 m). The flood elevations for the 10-year and 100-year floods are 911.5 feet (277.8 m) and 913.6 feet (278.5 m).

== Resorts and inns ==
Lake Buel was rarely used for recreation until the 1870s when it became a major summer attraction for the outlying area. Gibson's Grove opened on the south side of the lake's in the early part of the decade and shortly thereafter Turner's Landing opened on the lake's northwest end.

=== Gibson’s Grove ===
In the early part of the 1870s, George N. Gibson established a pine grove on the south side of the lake's outlet as a picnic area, calling it Gibson's Grove. In 1875, picnickers were caught in a sudden rain storm, which prompted the construction of a dining hall, the lake's first building. In 1876, Gibson's added a launch, the Wm. B. Gibson, as an attraction, and by the following year Gibson's hosted fishing derbies, dances, clambakes, and tally-ho parties. These events were often integrated and never segregated. Gibson's had 300 visitors on good days. Gibson's added an ice house in 1893. In the early 1900s, Gibson's had available for rent: three furnished overnight cottages (each included wood, ice, and a boat), an unfurnished farm house, and two extended-stay cottages (each included a boat and telephone service).

As early as 1929, Gibson's had a Sellner toboggan slide. It was eventually removed in the mid-1950s because of liability issues.

Between 1933 and 1947, Gibson sold off portions of his land as lots. In 1941 and 1949 Gibson sold lots to the Menaker family as they expanded Camp To-Ho-Ne. In 1952, Gibson's was leased to Sonny Zanetti, who renovated the boats, including the Minnehaha, which no longer worked but was kept on display at the main dock. During this era, the pavilion had a jukebox that ran throughout business hours.

Gibson's was sold outright in 1955. The new owners opened a tavern, the Blue Gill Club. The property was sold again in 1963; the Blue Gill was razed, and a new restaurant was built, which included a bar and a second story dance floor. The property was sold again in 1968, and efforts were made to continue the Blue Gill Club. In 1975, the main building and other buildings were razed. The Blue Gill was renovated into a private cottage in 1978.

=== Turner’s Landing ===
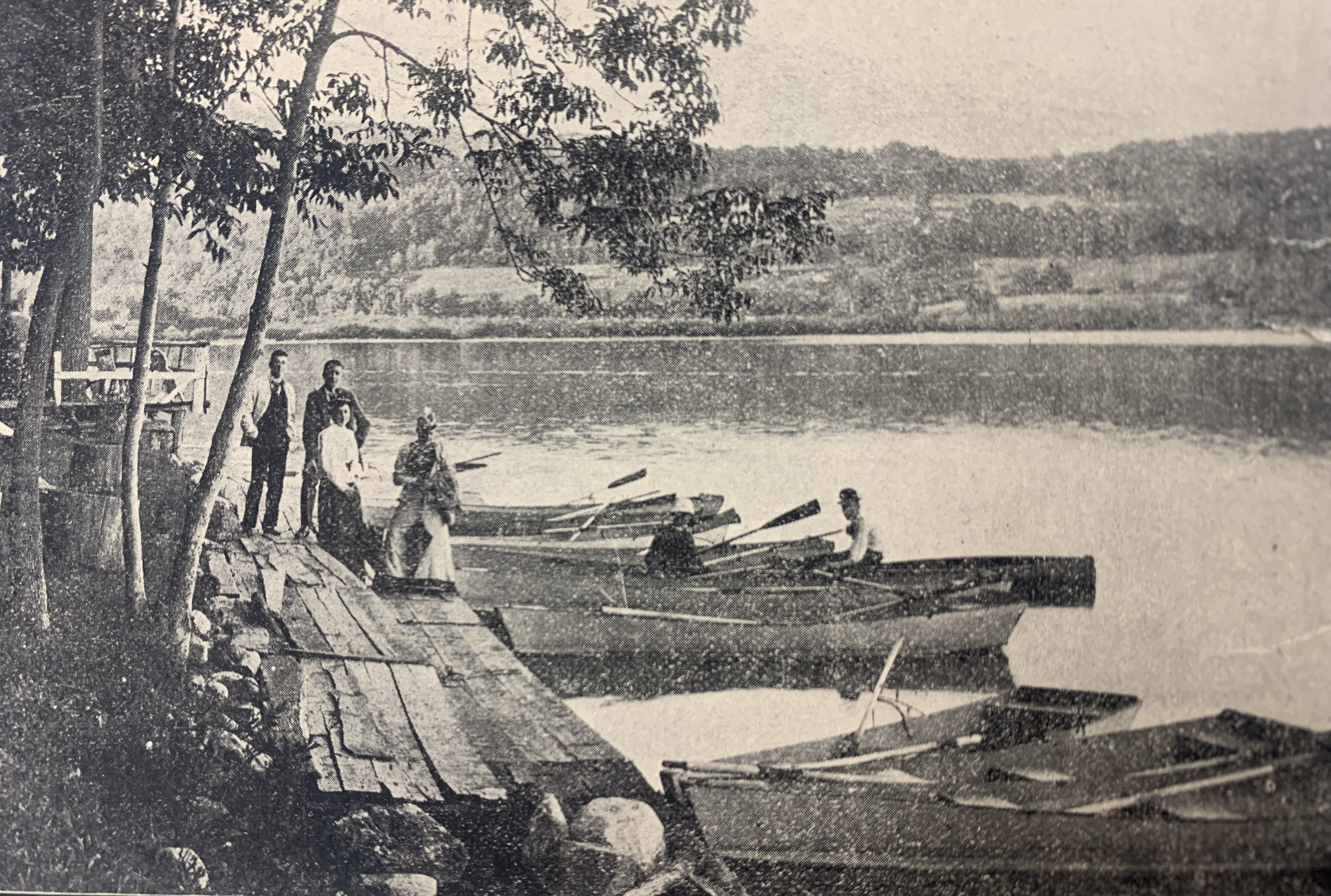
Turner's Landing, c. 1900

Turner's Landing was established around 1875. It was also known as Turner's View House and Turner's Lakeview Villa. Turner's hosted gypsy carnivals from 1875 to 1877. In the 1880s, Turner's had over 400 visitors a week, sometimes 200 a day. In 1900, Turner's had its busiest season to date. Prior to World War I, people could overnight there in rented tents.

In 1936, Turner's renovated the main building and updated its cottages, introducing electricity to some. The 150-acre (0.61 km^{2}) property was sold in 1937.

=== Littlecrest Inn ===
The Littlecrest Inn (aka Littlecrest), which boarded summer guests, started in 1937. It included individual cabins. Renovations occurred in 1947, which focused on the main building. It closed in 1959 when a judgment forced the owner to compensate a worker injured on the premises. The following year it re-opened under new ownership as the Seven Arts Guest Lodge, but it only ran for one season. The main lodge eventually burned in 1975. Some of the original buildings still remain as private cottages.

=== Miami Beach ===
Miami Beach, an amusement and swimming resort, opened on the north shore of the lake about 1925. The upstairs had a jukebox, a big front porch, a dance hall, refreshment room and kitchen. The main building was destroyed by fire in 1947.

=== Bigford’s Landing ===
Bigford's Landing was established in 1910. It had its own launch, a restaurant and camps.

=== Hebert’s Beach ===
Hebert's Beach opened in 1946. It included a large hall which hosted square dances. In 1955, the building was converted into a 7-unit motel. The beach itself closed in 1962 but continued to rent boats. The motel was then converted into apartments and renamed first the Leeside Lodge, and then Blue Heron Landing.

== Private cottages ==
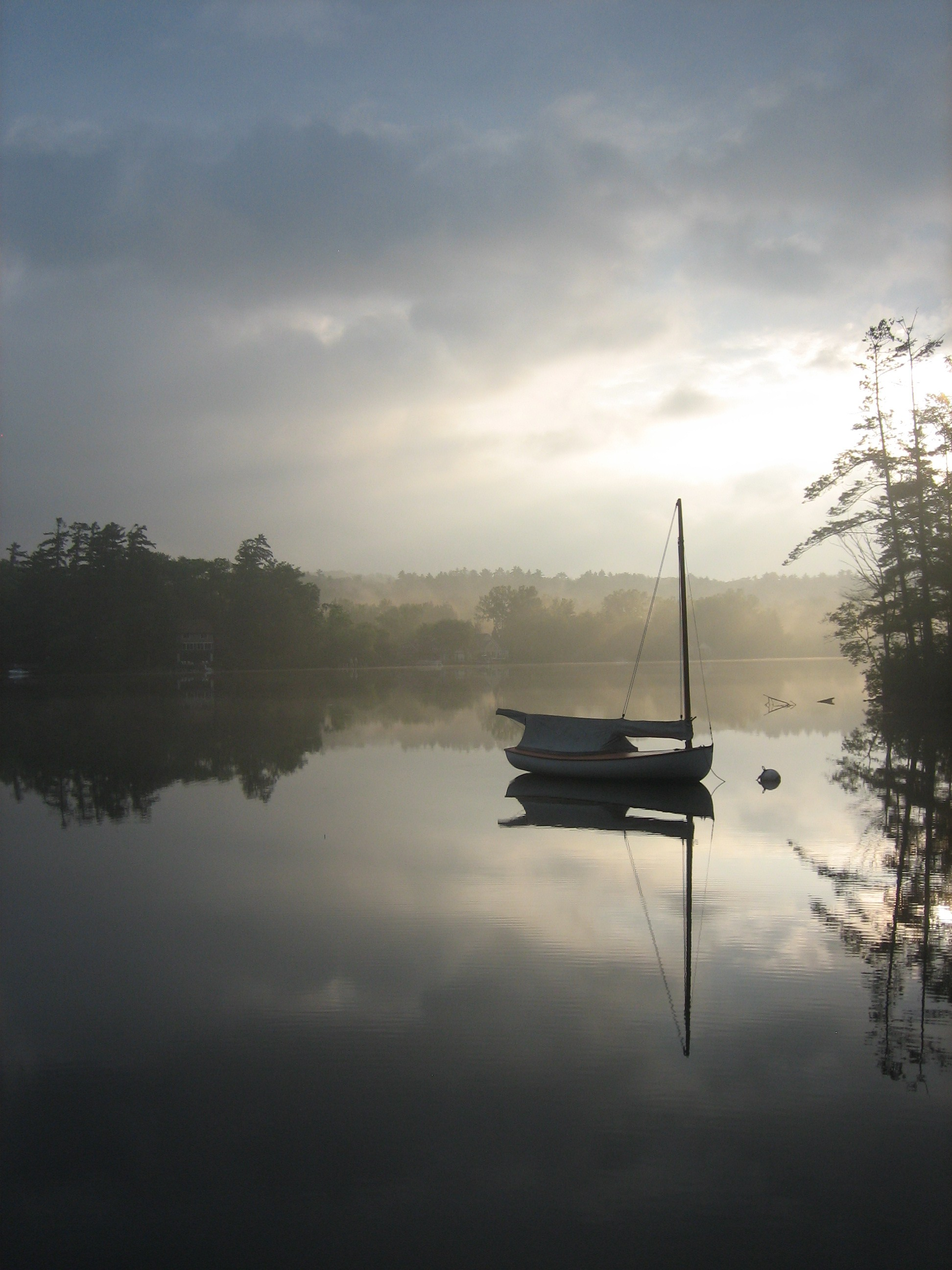
July, early morning

The first private cabin on Lake Buel was built in 1881 by Dr. Willard Rice, a Great Barrington dentist. In 1894, the lease was transferred for $1 to Charles Booth and John England who renovated the building, raising height of the roof, adding a kitchen, and enlarging the porch around a birch tree. It became the Mahaiwe Club, for men only. In the early 1900s, Great Barrington's Sedgwick School, a boy's private school, built a cottage north of Turner's for its students' recreation.

In 1904, there were 21 buildings on Lake Buel, 8 in Monterey and 13 in New Marlborough. Pre-1920s private cottage names included: Camp Tee-Hee, Wildwood, Dewdrop Inn, Brookmede, Woodycrest, Sunset View, Lake Breeze, High Lawn, The Maples, Kamp Kozy, Highwood Hall, Bay View, Camp Runamuck, Merry Wood, Sunnybank and Kamp Kontent.

In the 1930s, New Marlborough had no zoning laws on the books for lot size requirements along the lake. Between 1933 and 1941, Gibson sold over a dozen lots of varying sizes and shapes in the lakeside community, and seven more by 1947. The last lot was sold in 1959.

In 1971, the Hebert family purchased neighboring wetlands and began filling it with gravel. Cottages were built on the landfill and eventually sold. The area was known as Cavity Cove and Cavity Row.

== Launches ==
The first launch on Lake Buel was the Wm. B. Gibson, which made its public debut on July 4, 1876. The first steamboat in Berkshire County, it had a 6’ diameter wheel, a 14-hp engine, a 7’-high boiler, and could carry 200 people on its two decks.

The Wm. B. Gibson picked up passengers at Gibson's Grove and at Turner's Lake View Hall. It made the 1.25-mile (2.01 km) trip in 17 minutes. Fares were 20 cents for adults and 10 for children. After being sold by Gibson to Turner, the steamer's name was changed to the Lake Buell. The craft went through major renovations in 1879 and 1882. Before being launched for the 1885 season, it was destroyed by arson. Around 1891 Turner launched a new steamer, the Lake Buel. It was 20 feet (6.1 m) long and 8 feet (2.4 m) wide, propelled by a screw, and ran on oil. Turner continued to run this launch until 1934.

Another launch, a motorboat, was active in 1911 and run by Levi Huntley out of a cottage owned by J.M. Bigford.

Gibson's started a new launch in 1918. It was constructed in Norwalk, Connecticut by Fay & Bowen and called the Minnehaha. A bigger and improved Minnehaha replaced it in the mid-1950s.

In the 1940s, Gibson's also ran a Chris-Craft.

The lake's first gasoline boat was privately owned by W.E. Hill. It was 24 feet (7.3 m) long. He did not offer public rides.

== Summer camps ==
The lake has a long history of summer camps. A Camp Buel existed as early as 1900. Camp Berkshire, a small boys camp, started in 1912 and ended before 1937. It initially used Gibson's Grove as a home base. Camp Owaissa was a summer camp for girls on the west shore from 1919 to 1920. In 1921 it moved to Lake Garfield. Camp Half Moon started about 1920. It became co-ed in 1994 and is still active.

Camp To-Ho-Ne started in 1921 on the former Owaissa grounds. It was owned and operated by Pete Menaker, brother of Robert Menaker. To-Ho-Ne used a system of tribal government “to maintain discipline and safety.” In 1924, 200 acres (0.81 km^{2}) were purchased to expand the camp. Eventually added were tennis courts, a dispensary and a lodge. The camp had a woodworking shop, held Saturday night plays, Wednesday hikes and staged a season-ending award ceremony. 1970 was the camp's last year. In 1986 the land was sold and turned into a 27-lot housing development, To Ho Ne Shores.

In 1937, Turner's Landing was sold, and the site became a camp, first called Camp Mi Yo Quan and then Berkshire Highland. Berkshire Highland ran until 1956. In 1957 and 1958, the site was the Ted Mack Camp, a summer music camp for kids. Activities at Ted Mack included swimming, boating, weaving, music lessons and pony rides. Weekly shows were put on, including an end-of-the-season Broadway-type show. Guys and Dolls ended one season. Frank Loesser introduced the show; his daughter Susan was a camper there. Marvin Hamlisch was also a camper there as was Bruce Vilanch.

From 1960 to 1984, it was Camp Deerwood. Deerwood was owned by Zoltan Zantay, who was also a professional musician. Deerwood offered athletics, aquatics, arts, ham radio lessons, crafts, foreign languages and photography.

In 2000, the land was sold again and became the Seven Stones, a venue for business retreats, weddings and family reunions. In 2003, Seven Stones hosted the 2003 World Gay Outdoor Gathering. In 2008, the site was purchased by Kutsher's Sports Academy, which was moving its camp from Monticello, New York Kutsher's hosted 200 campers in 2008.

The Fokine Ballet Camp leased Littlecrest for eight weeks each summer from 1957 to 1960 before relocating to a site in Lenox, Massachusetts. Bigford's Landing hosted a Girl Scout Summer Camp throughout the 1950s.

== Associations ==
The Lake Buel Association began in 1938; it focused on the lake's health, especially the elimination of weeds, and on social events. It was active as late as 1976.

In 1986, with a landowners’ vote of 147–4, the Lake Buel Restoration-Preservation district was formed. It was the first of its kind in Massachusetts for a great pond. It allowed non-resident landowners to vote in Massachusetts.

== Wildlife ==
The following charts include species found in wetland, grazed wet meadow, forested wetland and aquatic environments in and around Lake Buel.

Animals	Species
Fishes	Black crappie, bluegill, brook trout, brown bullhead, brown trout, chain pickerel, largemouth bass, pumpkinseed, rainbow trout, rock bass, white perch, yellow perch, white sucker, minnows, northern pike (introduced in 1979), bridle shiner, common shiner, fallfish, golden shiner, and tiger muskies (introduced in 1997).
Reptiles	Common snapping turtle, wood turtle, spotted turtle, and painted turtle.
Amphibians	Common mudpuppy, dusky salamander, eastern newt, spring peeper, green frog, bullfrog, and northern leopard frog.
Mammal	American beaver and muskrat. American mink have not been observed at the lake, but likely use the perimeter and wetlands.
Zooplankton	Daphnia sp., Bosmina sp., Diaptomus sp., Lyngbya sp., and Oscillatoria sp.

Plants	Species
Aquatic plants	Eurasian water milfoil (invasive), rigid hornwort, fragrant water lily, Chara sp., common bladderwort, wild celery, slender naiad, water-shield, common duckweed, common pondweed, water buttercup, curly-leaf pondweed (invasive), largeleaf pondweed, Illinois pondweed, Robbins' pondweed, white-stemmed pondweed, pickerelweed, bullhead lily, Sagittaria sp., and Elodea sp.
Trees	Speckled alder, red maple, red osier dogwood, yellow birch, paper birch, American hornbeam, tamarack larch, American elm, eastern white pine, black willow, and eastern cottonwood.
Shrubs	Leather leaf, American winterberry, swamp rose, bog myrtle, broadleaf meadowsweet, arrow-wood viburnum, shrubby cinquefoil, witch hazel, and baby rose.
Poales	Common reed, river bulrush, tussock sedge, narrow leaf cattail, giant bur-reed, reed canary grass, timothy-grass, and water sedge.
Herbs	Harlequin blueflag, garden angelica, rough avens, curled dock, upright bedstraw, and common milkweed.
Wildflowers	Goldenrod sp., Joe-Pye weed, field thistle, meadow buttercup, true forget-me-not, and common jewelweed.
Ferns	Sensitive fern, cinnamon fern, and flowering fern.
Vines	Nightshade (invasive)
Scouring rushes	Field horsetail

== Milfoil infestation ==
Lake Buel suffers from an infestation of milfoil (Myriophyllum spicatum). It is likely that this aquatic plant was introduced unintentionally in the early 1960s. The magnitude and spread of the aquatic plant increased notably between 1974 and 1988, with a particularly dramatic increase between 1974 and 1981. These increases occurred because of fragmentation and vegetation reproduction. Because of decaying milfoil in the lake's two hypolimnia during this era, the lake experienced an intensification of hypolimnetic anoxia.

In the early 1990s the aquatic plant covered over 85 acres (over 40%) of the lake. This infestation creates a large oxygen demand in the lake, limiting cold water habitat.

Aquatic macrophyte harvesting was initiated in 1980. A 90-acre (360,000 m^{2}) harvest was performed that year.

== Zebra mussel concerns ==
In July 2009, zebra mussels were discovered in Laurel Lake in Lee, prompting the Massachusetts Department of Fish and Game to close Laurel Lake's boat ramp. A number of lakes around the area responded by closing their ramps, including Stockbridge Bowl. The Monterey Board of Selectmen voted to close Lake Buel's ramp and on July 22, the ramp was blocked off with a concrete barricade and padlocked chain.

A non-native invasive species, zebra mussels were originally native to the lakes of southeast Russia. In the 1990s they began colonizing the Great Lakes, and have since spread into streams and rivers nationwide. In some areas they completely cover the substrate, sometimes covering other freshwater mussels. They can grow so densely that they block pipelines, clogging water intakes of municipal water supplies and hydroelectric companies.

As of 2009, Massachusetts has no specific legislation to address invasive species, leaving it up to local authorities.

== Samuel Buell ==
On July 23, 1812, Samuel Buell (1796–1865), age 16, saved three of seven people during a row boat accident. Three others drowned and one swam to shore on his own. That September, he was presented with a gold heart medal by the Washington Benevolent Society of Tyringham. Buell eventually married, had a family and lived as a farmer. He died in 1865 and is buried in Mahaiwe Cemetery in Great Barrington. The lake was not named in his honor until a decade after his death, July 4, 1876, during a Centennial ceremony.

In 1878, the Berkshire Courier dropped the second L from Buell, and soon other papers followed suit.

=== Other drownings on the lake ===
- John Benton, age 8, in 1904; fell from a boat
- Joseph Sabba(Correction: Giuseppe Sebben, his name was miswritten on newspapers) of East Caanan, 27, in June 1925; fell from a canoe
- Alfred Kotite of Brooklyn, 14, June 1925; fell from a boat rented from Turner's
- Allen Lasher of Germantown, NY, 18, June 1930; fell from a canoe
- James Bearder of West Springfield, MA, 51, June 1945; near Gibson's Grove while fishing alone
- Paul Schoenfeld of Brooklyn, NY; 14, June 1945; fell from a boat while fishing

== Feats ==
The first person known to swim the length of the lake was Helen Tobey, 17, who, in 1910, swam from Turner's to Gibson's (about 1 1/2 miles) in 70 minutes.

Helen Humphries was the first to swim the length of the lake from Miami Beach to Gibson's (about 2 miles). She did it in 1928 in 70 minutes.

Michael Danek of Westfield, Massachusetts caught a state record northern pike in January 1987; it weighed 32 pounds, 4 ounces.

== Notable summer residents ==
- Roy Lichtenstein - In the 1920s, as a child Lichtenstein summered at Lake Buel.
- Alan Ford, honeymooned at Littlecrest in 1945.
- Lud Gluskin
- Walt Kuhn, maintained a summer studio on the lake from 1940 to 1942.
- Ted Mack, ran a summer camp, 1957 to 1960.
