= Haskell Cohen =

- Born: March 12, 1914; Worcester, Massachusetts, United States
- Died: June 28, 2000 (aged 86); Fort Lee, New Jersey, United States
- Occupation: National Basketball Association public relations director

Haskell Cohen (March 12, 1914 – June 28, 2000) was the public relations director of the National Basketball Association (NBA) from 1950 to 1969. He is known as the creator of the NBA All-Star Game. He was inducted to the International Jewish Sports Hall of Fame for his contributions in basketball.

== Career ==
In 1951, Cohen joined the NBA as the league's publicity director. He teamed up with NBA President Maurice Podoloff, forming a two-man office. At that time, the basketball world had just been stunned by the college basketball point-shaving scandal. Cohen came up with an idea of hosting an All-Star Game featuring the league's best player, similar to the Major League Baseball's All-Star Game. He believed that such showcase would regain fans' interest in basketball. Podoloff and the majority of team owners were pessimistic that the idea would go bad and taint the league's image. However, Boston Celtics owner remained confident with Cohen's idea. He offered to host the game and to cover all the expenses or potential losses incurred from the game. The first NBA All-Star Game was held on March 2, 1951, at the Boston Garden. The game became a success, drawing a crowd of 10,094, much higher than that season's average attendance of 3,500. Since then, the All-Star Game became an annual mid-season tradition in the NBA.

Before joining the NBA, Cohen was a writer for the Pittsburgh Courier and also a scout for the Duquesne Dukes. While scouting for Duquesne, he discovered Fletcher Jones. Jones became a professional basketball player before becoming a medical doctor. He later teamed up with Cohen, NBA player Jack Twyman and hotel owner Milton Kutsher in 1958 to create the Maurice Stokes charity game. The game was intended to raise money for Stokes, who had just suffered encephalopathy, a brain injury that damaged his motor control center. That game became an annual tradition to raise money for other former players in financial need. The Maurice Stokes games were held at Kutsher's Hotel in Monticello, New York, or at their camp, the Kutsher's Sports Academy.

In 1948, Cohen founded the United States Committee Sports for Israel. The committee sponsored American participation in the Maccabiah Games in Israel, an Olympic-style competition for Jewish athletes. He later became the president of the committee from 1961 to 1969. In 1981, he became the first chairman of International Jewish Sports Hall of Fame Selection Committee. He held the position until 1989 and in 1991 he received the Hall of Fame Pillar of Achievement, an honor given to a person who have made significant contributions to sports.

He was a longtime contributing editor to Parade, an American national Sunday newspaper magazine. He originated its high school all-American teams in football and basketball. He was also the sports editor for the Jewish Telegraphic Agency for 17 years. He was also a member of the Basketball Hall of Fame Board of Trustees, a member of the United States Olympic Basketball Committee, and a member of the Amateur Basketball Association USA.

== Personal life ==
Haskell Cohen was born to a Jewish family in Worcester, Massachusetts. He graduated from Boston University with a journalism degree.

Cohen died on June 28, 2000, in his home in Fort Lee, New Jersey, at the age of 86. He is survived by two daughters, three grandchildren, and 21 great-grandchildren.
