= Konkapot River =

River in the U.S. states of Massachusetts and Connecticut

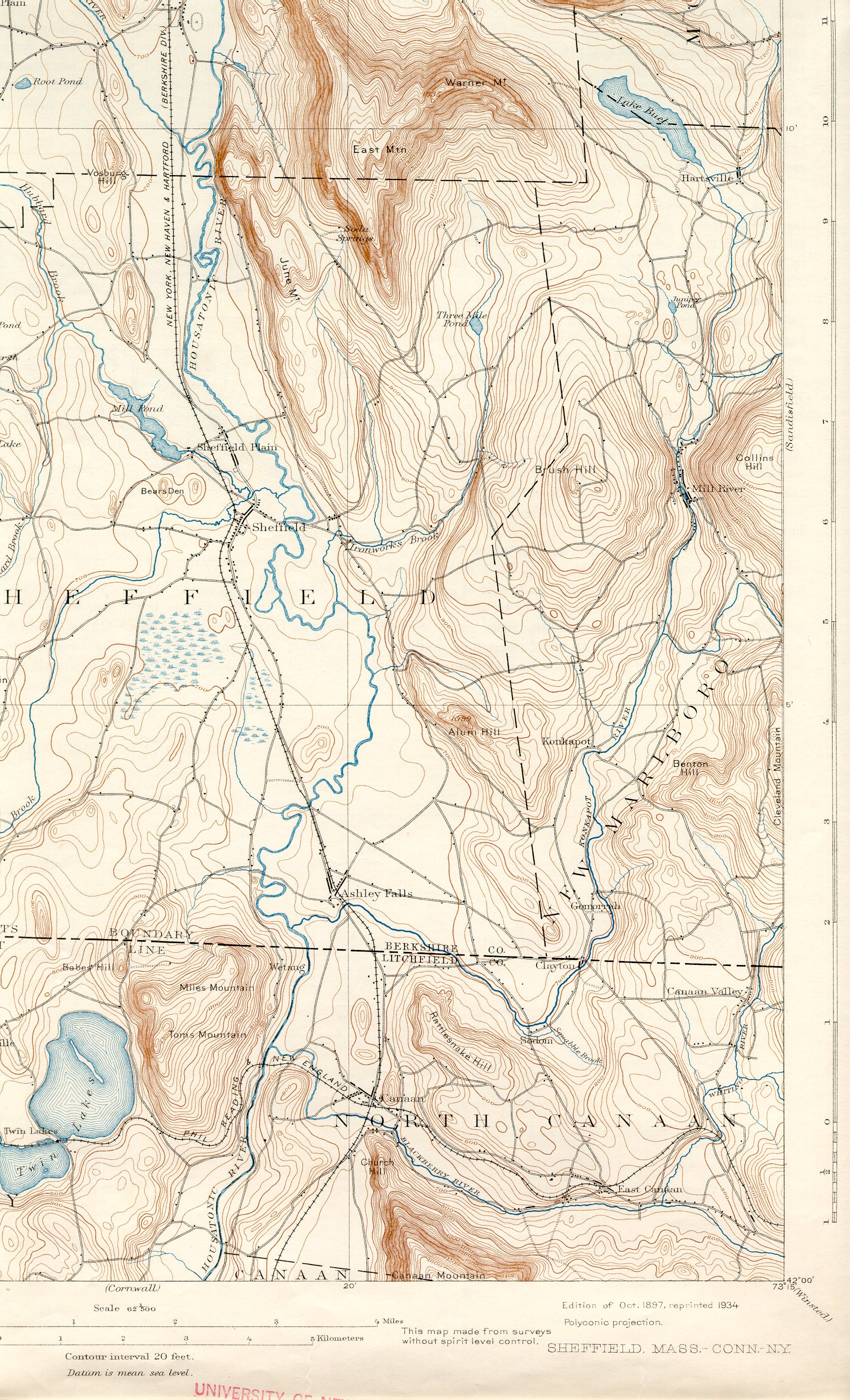
Konkapot River

The Konkapot River is a 22.1-mile-long (35.6 km) river in southwestern Massachusetts and northern Connecticut. It is a tributary of the Housatonic River, not to be confused with the smaller Konkapot Brook in Stockbridge (another Housatonic tributary). The river was named for Captain John Konkapot, an Indian chief.

The Konkapot River begins at Lake Garfield (42.1907°N 73.2133°W) in Monterey, Massachusetts, and the stream from Lake Buel feeds into the Konkapot about 5 miles (8 km) downstream in Hartsville (42.1593°N 73.2633°W). It then runs south to the Connecticut border near East Sheffield, Massachusetts (42.0466°N 73.2861°W), and then primarily west to its confluence with the Housatonic River in Ashley Falls, Massachusetts (42.0505°N 73.3430°W). About 20 miles (32 km) of the river are within Massachusetts, with the remainder in Connecticut.

The river historically powered mills in Monterey and several villages of New Marlborough, Massachusetts, including grist and cider mills, a box factory, and three major paper mills. As many as 15 mills were built along one three-mile stretch, although they did not operate simultaneously. It still suffers from mercury pollution.

== See also ==
- List of rivers of Massachusetts
- List of rivers of Connecticut
