= Bidwell House Museum =

Historic house in Massachusetts, United States

- Rev. Adonijah Bidwell House
- U.S. National Register of Historic Places
- U.S. Historic district
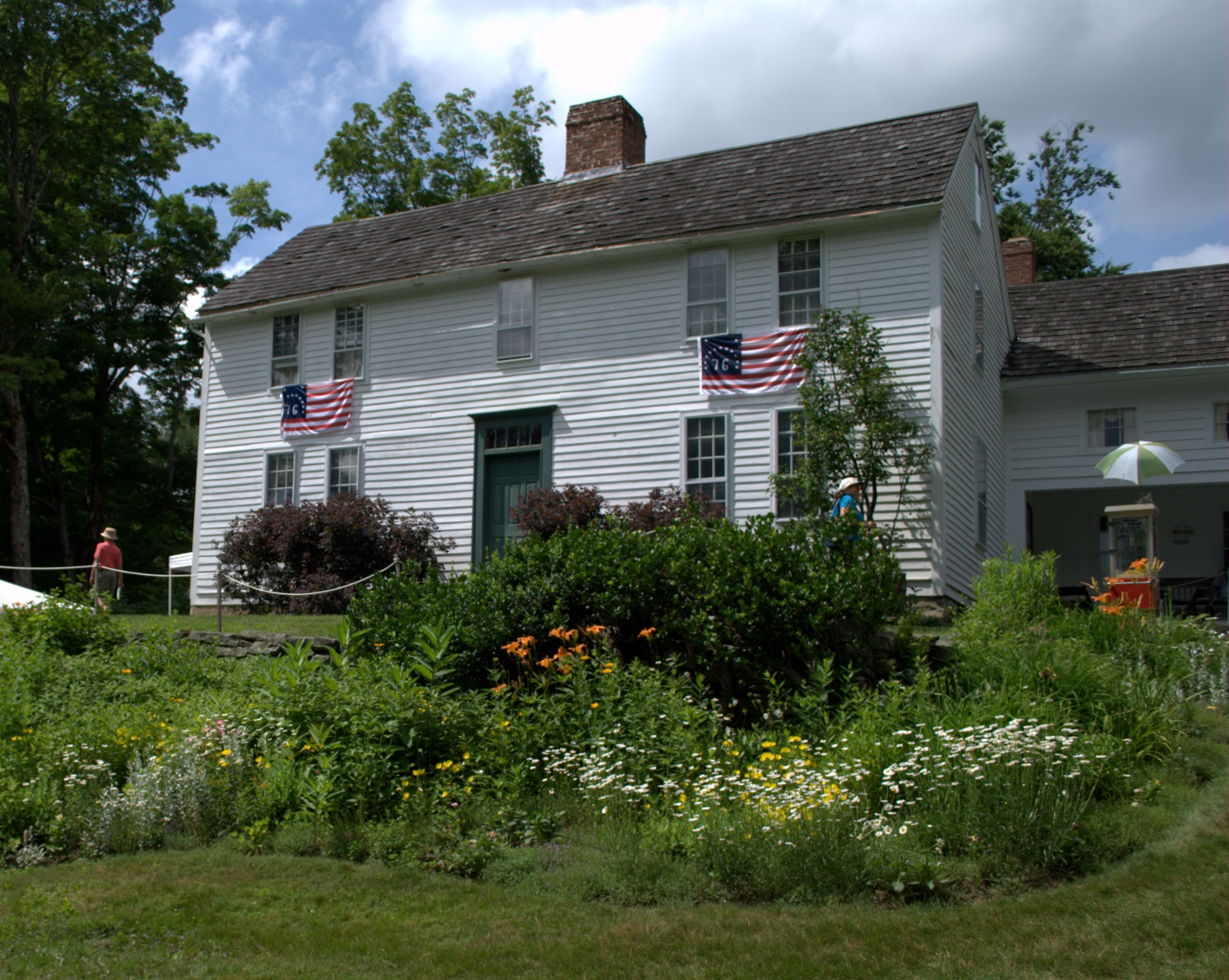

- Location within Massachusetts Location within the United States
- Location: Monterey, Massachusetts
- Coordinates: 42°12′27″N 73°13′9″W
- Built: c. 1762
- Architectural style: Georgian Saltbox, Classic Colonial, Greek Revival
- NRHP reference No.: 82004954
- Added to NRHP: August 26, 1982

The Bidwell House Museum is a historic house and museum on Art School Road in Monterey, Massachusetts, United States.

== The Bidwell House ==
The house was built in the 1760s by the Reverend Adonijah Bidwell, the first minister in what was then Township No. 1. At that time, the house was the demographic center of the township and was located on the route of the Boston-Albany Post Road. It is a classic Georgian Saltbox built around a central chimney. Four fireplaces and two beehive ovens feed into the chimney structure, which is supported by a classical Roman Arch in the basement. The house has two additions, the Ell Addition (1820s) and a Greek Revival/Carriage Barn addition (1840s).

== History ==
Reverend Bidwell, a patriot, was an active supporter of the United States Army. Henry Knox, famous for his leadership of the expedition that carried strategically crucial cannons from Fort Ticonderoga to Dorchester Heights, passed through Monterey on that famous mission, most likely on the post road. Historical evidence suggests that Knox may have passed through the Bidwell property on his famous journey, now the basis for books, films, and the historic Henry Knox Trail. He may have even stopped at the house in the middle of winter, possibly to stay a night or obtain supplies.

The Reverend died in 1784 and left the house to his son, Adonijah the Younger. Adonijah the Younger utilized the house and grounds (approximately 125 acres (0.51 km^{2}) at the time) as a family farm, before selling the house in his old age to his son, John Devotion Bidwell, for "love and affection and one dollar." In 1853, John Devotion Bidwell sold the house to the Carrington family after 103 years of Bidwell ownership. At the time, John Bidwell was a selectman, justice of the peace, and prominent personality in the newly incorporated town of Monterey, Massachusetts (1847). The house remained with the Carrington family for three generations and 61 years until they sold it to a lumber company in 1914. After using the house as a base for local operations, the company sold it to an Art School. It was used as a faculty house by the school until 1935. By this time it had acquired the name "Deepwood Manse." By the 1950s, the house was in an increasing state of disrepair.

In 1960, it was purchased by Jack Hargis and David Brush, two fashion designers from New York City. They bought it and 196 acres (0.79 km^{2}) surrounding for the sum of $30,000 and proceeded to spend the next 25 years restoring the house. They were fortunate enough to come across the inventory of the Rev. Bidwell's estate, which listed all his worldly possessions at the time of his death. Hargis and Brush proceeded to fill the restored house with dated pieces of furniture, artwork, and other objects, many of them originally owned by the Reverend.

== Today ==
It was added to the National Register of Historic Places in 1982. In 1990, the house became a museum, the result of a death request by David Brush. It is open for tours from Thursday through Monday between Memorial Day and Columbus Day, as well as for special events. It is open from 11:00 AM to 4:00 PM, with guided tours of the house starting on the hour.

== See also ==
- National Register of Historic Places listings in Berkshire County, Massachusetts
