= Camp Half Moon =

Sleepover camp in Monterey, Massachusetts, US

Coordinates: 42°10′24.8″N 73°16′35.6″W

Camp Half Moon is a co-ed sleepover camp on Lake Buel in Monterey, Massachusetts.

Camp Half Moon was established as a boys camp in 1922. Since 2022, the camp is currently owned and operated by Camp Kimama, an Israeli company with camp sites in Israel and the US. The Mann family, originally from Lititz, Pennsylvania, owned and operated Half Moon after purchasing it from Dr. Ed Storey in 1967, who had owned and operated it for over 25 years. "Doc" Storey had been a history teacher in Pelham, New York, and many campers during the 1950s and 1960s came from Pelham and surrounding communities of southern Westchester County.

For many years a large number of the boys attending Half Moon came not only from the northeastern United States but also from all across Latin America. Within just a few years after the 1959 Cuban Revolution numerous families who escaped from the Communist takeover of the island and resettled in Puerto Rico were sending their sons to Half Moon to have a broader experience with American youngsters from the mainland. The camp is now for both boys and girls.
