= Barnabas Bidwell =

Politician and lawyer of Massachusetts and Upper Canada

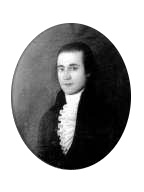
- Portrait by John Brewster, Jr.

Member of the U.S. House of Representatives from Massachusetts's 12th district
- In office March 4, 1805 – July 13, 1807
- Preceded by: Simon Larned
- Succeeded by: Ezekiel Bacon

Attorney General of Massachusetts
- In office June 15, 1807 – August 30, 1810
- Governor: James Sullivan; Levi Lincoln Sr. Christopher Gore; Elbridge Gerry
- Preceded by: James Sullivan
- Succeeded by: Perez Morton

Member of the Massachusetts State Senate
- In office 1801–1804

Member of the Massachusetts House of Representatives
- In office 1805–1807

Treasurer of Berkshire County, Massachusetts
- In office September, 1791 – August, 1810

Personal details
- Born: August 23, 1763 Township No. 1 (now Monterey, Massachusetts), Province of Massachusetts Bay, British America
- Died: July 27, 1833 (aged 69) Bath, Upper Canada
- Resting place: Cataraqui Cemetery, Kingston, Ontario, Canada
- Party: Democratic-Republican
- Children: Marshall Spring Bidwell
- Education: Yale College class of 1785, Brown University
- Profession: Attorney

Barnabas Bidwell (August 23, 1763 – July 27, 1833) was an author, teacher and politician of the late 18th and early 19th centuries, active in Massachusetts and Upper Canada (now Ontario). Educated at Yale, he practised law in western Massachusetts and served as treasurer of Berkshire County. He served in the state legislature as representative and senator, as well as in the United States Congress as spokesman for the administration of Thomas Jefferson. He was effective in defending the administration's positions and passing important legislation. He resigned his seat in Congress in July 1807.

He was the Massachusetts Attorney General from 1807 to 1810, when exaggerated press accounts of irregularities in the Berkshire County books halted his political career and prompted his flight to Upper Canada. Bidwell later paid the $63.18, plus fines, which he attributed to an error by a Berkshire County clerk while Bidwell had been away on duties in Boston. Nonetheless, the controversy, exaggerated in the press by his Federalist Party enemies, effectively scuppered his potential appointment to the U.S. Supreme Court.

In Upper Canada, he won a seat in the provincial Legislative Assembly but his political opponents managed to expel him on charges of having his American citizenship, being a fugitive and having immoral character. He remained in Upper Canada for the rest of his life.

== Early life ==
Bidwell was son of American Revolutionary War Patriot Adonijah Bidwell, Yale 1740, and Jemima Devotion in Township No. 1 (now Monterey, Massachusetts), and he graduated from Yale College in 1785. Through his mother, he was descended from John Haynes, 5th Governor of Massachusetts and 1st Governor of Connecticut, and George Wyllys, 4th Governor of Connecticut. He later attended the college in the English Colony of Rhode Island and Providence Plantations (now known as Brown University) in Providence, Rhode Island. He studied law under judge Theodore Sedgwick of Stockbridge, Massachusetts. Sedgwick, a prominent member of the House of Representatives and later a senator, was an important spokesman for the Federalist Party. Bidwell was admitted to the Massachusetts state bar in 1805 and commenced practice in Stockbridge, Massachusetts.

Barnabas was married to Mary Gray Bidwell and lived a very happy life with his wife. While he was traveling the couple kept in touch and sent each other very meaningful and extensive letters. Mary died around the age of 43 due to an illness.

== US political career ==
Bidwell was a Massachusetts state senator from 1801 to 1804 and a member of the Massachusetts House of Representatives from 1805 to 1807. Bidwell was also elected to the federal House of Representatives in 1805 as a Democratic-Republican. He served in the Ninth and Tenth Congresses, resigning his seat in 1807.

Bidwell broke with the Federalists and became the leading spokesman of the Democratic-Republican administration of President Thomas Jefferson in the US Congress. In the House of Representatives, Bidwell displaced John Randolph of Roanoke, as administration leader and become the leading spokesman of Jefferson. He successfully defended the president's policy of imposing economic sanctions in response to British violations of neutral rights at sea. He also directed the campaign to purchase Florida and was the leading advocate for passage of the bill that abolished the slave trade in the US, which took effect in 1808. He was Attorney General of Massachusetts from 1807 to 1810, when his political opponents found a minor discrepancy in the Berkshire County books and made exaggerated allegations of corruption.

Accused of embezzling money while he was Berkshire County treasurer, he and his family fled to Upper Canada (now Ontario) in 1810 and settled in Kingston until an investigation could determine what if any liability he held. The charge was advanced by his political enemies in the Federalist Party, apparently to halt his rise as a Democratic-Republican and trusted confidant of Jefferson. At the time, he had been under consideration by President James Madison for a position on the US Supreme Court. The final judgment of the Berkshire court against him, which he paid in 1817, amounted to $330.64 damages and $63.18 costs. Since Bidwell was promptly able to pay both amounts, it was not because of the judgment that he fled. There is little reason, moreover, to doubt his assertion that because his public offices required his presence elsewhere in the United States, he employed clerks to handle his duties in Berkshire, one of whom, who had died by the time of financial exposure, had been responsible. He fled, he claimed, out of fear of his political enemies, who were exaggerating his personal responsibility and indebtedness.

== Exile ==
Bidwell won a seat in the Legislative Assembly of Upper Canada for Lennox and Addington but was unable to take his seat. His political opponents in Upper Canada brought an election petition challenging his election on the grounds that he was a fugitive from justice, he had an immoral character, and he had taken an oath of allegiance to the United States. John Beverley Robinson and Henry John Boulton paid for an investigation into Bidwell's career in the United States to discredit Bidwell's character. The investigation was published in The Kingston Chronicle and Bidwell proved that all the charges against him in the United States had been settled. After an unusually long debate, Bidwell was expelled from the House by a vote of 17–16.

Bidwell remained in Upper Canada until his death at Bath. His remains are interred in Kingston's Cataraqui Cemetery.

== Legacy ==
His son, Marshall Spring Bidwell, successfully sat in the same seat from 1824 to 1836. Marshall Spring Bidwell later left for the United States. Bidwell's sister, Theodosia Bidwell Brewer, was the grandmother of U.S. Supreme Court Justice David J. Brewer, who sat on the court from 1889 to 1910 with his uncle, Stephen J. Field.
