= Adonijah (given name) =

- Gender: Male

Origin
- Origin: Hebrew
- Meaning: "my lord is Yah"

Adonijah is the fourth son of King David in the Bible. The given name may also refer to:

== Biblical figures ==
- A Levite sent with the princes to teach the book of the law to the inhabitants of Judah (2 Chronicles 17:8)
- One of the "chiefs of the people" after the Babylonian captivity (Nehemiah 10:16)

== People ==
- Adonijah Bidwell (1716–1784), colonial American minister and supporter of American independence
- Adonijah Reid (born 1999), Canadian soccer player
- Adonijah Welch (1821–1889), United States Senator from Florida and the first president of Iowa State Agricultural College

== See also ==
- Jacob ben Hayyim ibn Adonijah (c. 1470–before 1538), Jewish biblical scholar
