= Kutsher's Camp Anawana =

Jewish summer camp in Monticello, New York

- Established: 1921
- Defunct: 1992
- Type: Jewish summer camp
- Key people: Jerry Parker, executive director (1960-1992)
- Formerly called: Camp Anawana

Camp Anawana, later known as Kutsher's Camp Anawana, was a summer sleepaway camp overlooking Anawana Lake in Monticello, New York.

== History ==
Camp Anawana was originally owned by Mrs. Anna Kahn. The camp's main building was destroyed by a fire on June 29, 1946.

In 1955, the camp partnered with Clair Bee to host Kutsher's National All-Sports Camp, associated with the nearby Kutsher's Hotel. After the development of a sports-focused sleepaway camp, Kutsher's Sports Academy, the Kutsher family purchased Camp Anawana. Kutsher's Camp Anawana operated through the summer of 1992. Following the end of the summer camp program, the camp has been used by the hotel as Club Anawana, offering water sports and beach activities.

== Programs ==
Activities at Camp Anawana included drama, Girls' Sing, intercamp sports, and color war. Later in the camp's history, Monday nights were movie nights. The last three days of a camp session included an awards night, a camp prom, and a banquet followed by a lakeside candlelight ceremony.

The camp's sports focus included sponsoring the Anawana Invitational Tournament for both basketball and volleyball, and a Biddy Basketball Tournament for younger boys Another favorite event was to attend the Maurice Stokes Game, an annual exhibition of professional basketball players held by Milt Kutsher.

== Notable alumni ==
- Matisyahu, musician
- Neal Shusterman, author

== Notable staff ==
- John Beake, NFL coach
