= Kutsher's Sports Academy =

Summer sleepaway camp in Monterey, Massachusetts, U.S.

Coordinates: 42.173248°N 73.286169°W

Kutsher's Sports Academy (KSA) was a summer sleepaway camp in Monterey, Massachusetts, for children ages 7–17. It was originally "conceived and developed by Milton and Joseph Kutsher and legendary basketball coach Clair F. Bee in 1968." The land was originally the Harmony Country Club. The Kutsher family owned and operated the academy until 2005 when they sold the camp to Marc White, the longtime Executive Director. Until 2007 it was located in Monticello, New York. The camp moved to the Berkshires at the start of 2008, and is now located on Lake Buel, just outside Great Barrington, Massachusetts. The former site in Monticello is being leased by an Orthodox Jewish camp.

Part of the reason for the move may be because the site was considered for a casino before the deal between the Kutsher family and the St. Regis Mohawks was cancelled in favor of another site.

Campers choose from a variety of sports, tailored to their own interests, either to increase their skills in a particular sport(s) or to try a sport they have not tried before. There are also opportunities for campers to play sports on a purely recreational level. Ten of the camp’s coaches have been there for more than 20 years. In 2007, Wil Cordero spent the whole summer there as a coach and has stayed with KSA ever since; other famous athletes have come to participate in a clinic for a day. Creative and performing arts activities were available as well. Mike Gilberg, a former camper and baseball coach, took over as Director of Kutsher's Sports Academy in 2016.

As seen in the Times-Herald Record on December 26, 2007, the Sullivan County site was leased to a Satmar group for five years beginning in 2008.

The reputation was so stellar among athletes that Joe DiMaggio and Wilt Chamberlain trained here in the off season. Wilt Chamberlain and Kareem Abdul Jabbar (then Lew Alcindor) faced each other for the first time in the Maurice Stokes Game, which was held each summer at the KSA Field House.

In November of 2024, the camp closed and became Berkshire Trails Camp.

== See also ==
- Kutsher's Camp Anawana
- Kutsher's Hotel and Country Club
