= Thomas Shepard House =

Historic house in Massachusetts, United States

- U.S. National Register of Historic Places
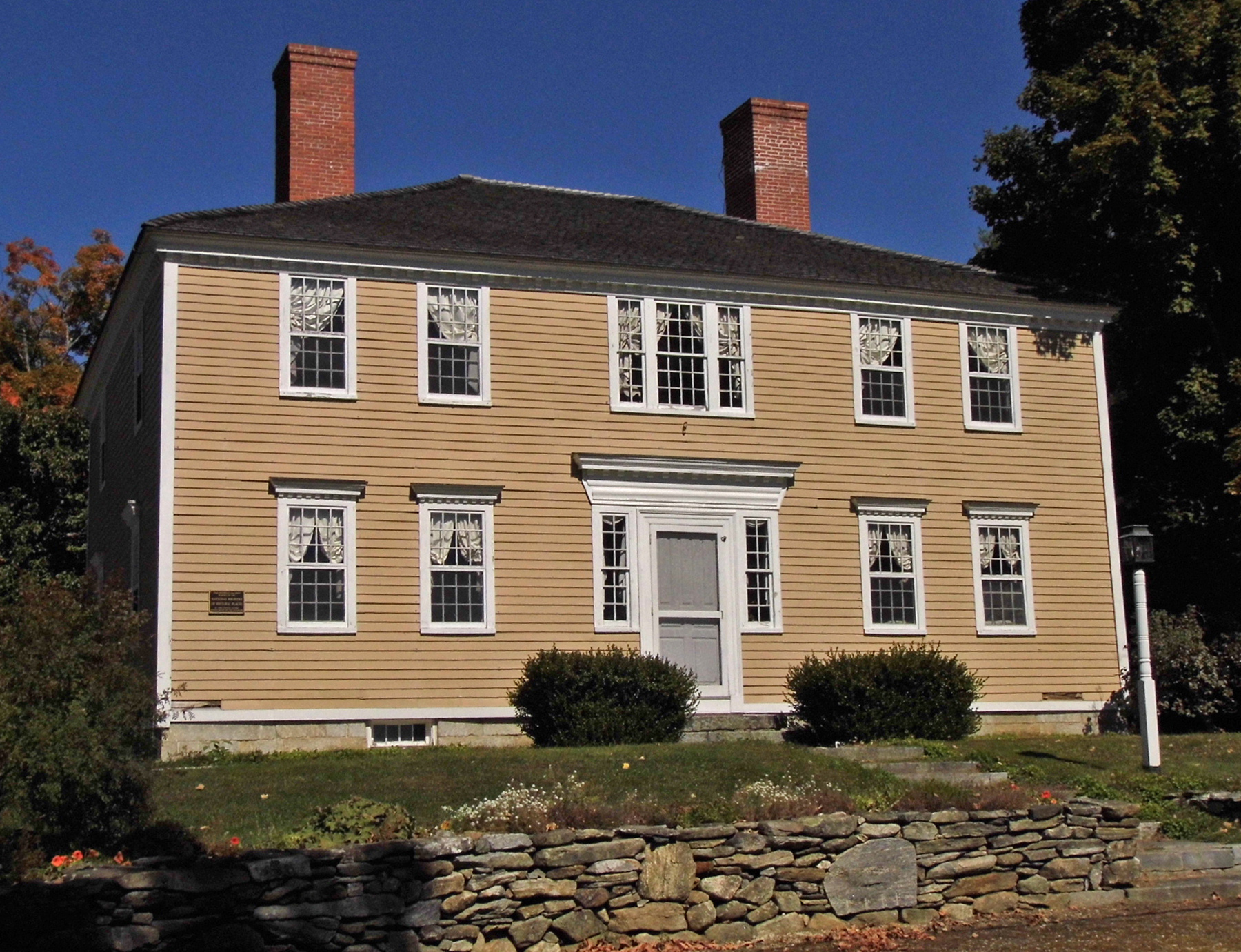

- Location within Massachusetts Location within the United States
- Location: 764 East Hill Rd., New Marlborough, Massachusetts
- Coordinates: 42°5′21″N 73°12′2″W
- Area: 13.65 acres (5.52 ha)
- Built: 1798
- Built by: Collar, Captain John
- Architectural style: Georgian
- NRHP reference No.: 84002085
- Added to NRHP: May 31, 1984

The Thomas Shepard House is a historic house at 764 East Hill Road in New Marlborough, Massachusetts, United States. It is one of the older homes in New Marlborough (built 1798), and is one of three 18th-century houses on a 3-mile (4.8 km) stretch of East Hill Road, which was then one of only three roads in the town. Thomas Shepard, for whom it was built, was a major figure in the town's early history. The house was listed on the National Register of Historic Places in 1984.

== Description and history ==
The Thomas Shepard House is located in a rural setting of eastern New Marlborough, on the north side of East Hill Road, west of its junction with Windemere Road. It is a two-story wood-frame structure, with a hip roof, two interior chimneys, and a clapboarded exterior. The main facade is five bays wide, with a center entrance framed by sidelight windows and a corniced entablature. Most windows are rectangular sash, topped by projecting cornices, while that above the entrance is a three-part window with narrow sash windows flanking a larger central one. The main roof line has a line of dentil moulding at the cornice. The house has retained most of its architectural work, although its roof was converted from a hip roof to a gable end roof in the 19th century, before being restored to its original form.

The house was built about 1798 by John Collar, a regionally prominent builder whose surviving houses are known for their quality workmanship. Thomas Shepard, for whom it was built, was one of four brothers who were early settlers of New Marlborough, arriving by 1768. The Shepards and the Hartwells, its next owner, were both involved in the establishment of the Baptist Church in New Marlborough. It is possible that the Baptists meetings were held in the large chamber on the second floor of this house; the congregation did not build a church until 1847.

== See also ==
- National Register of Historic Places listings in Berkshire County, Massachusetts
