= Clayton, Massachusetts =

Human settlement in United States of America

Coordinates: 42°02′35″N 73°17′13″W

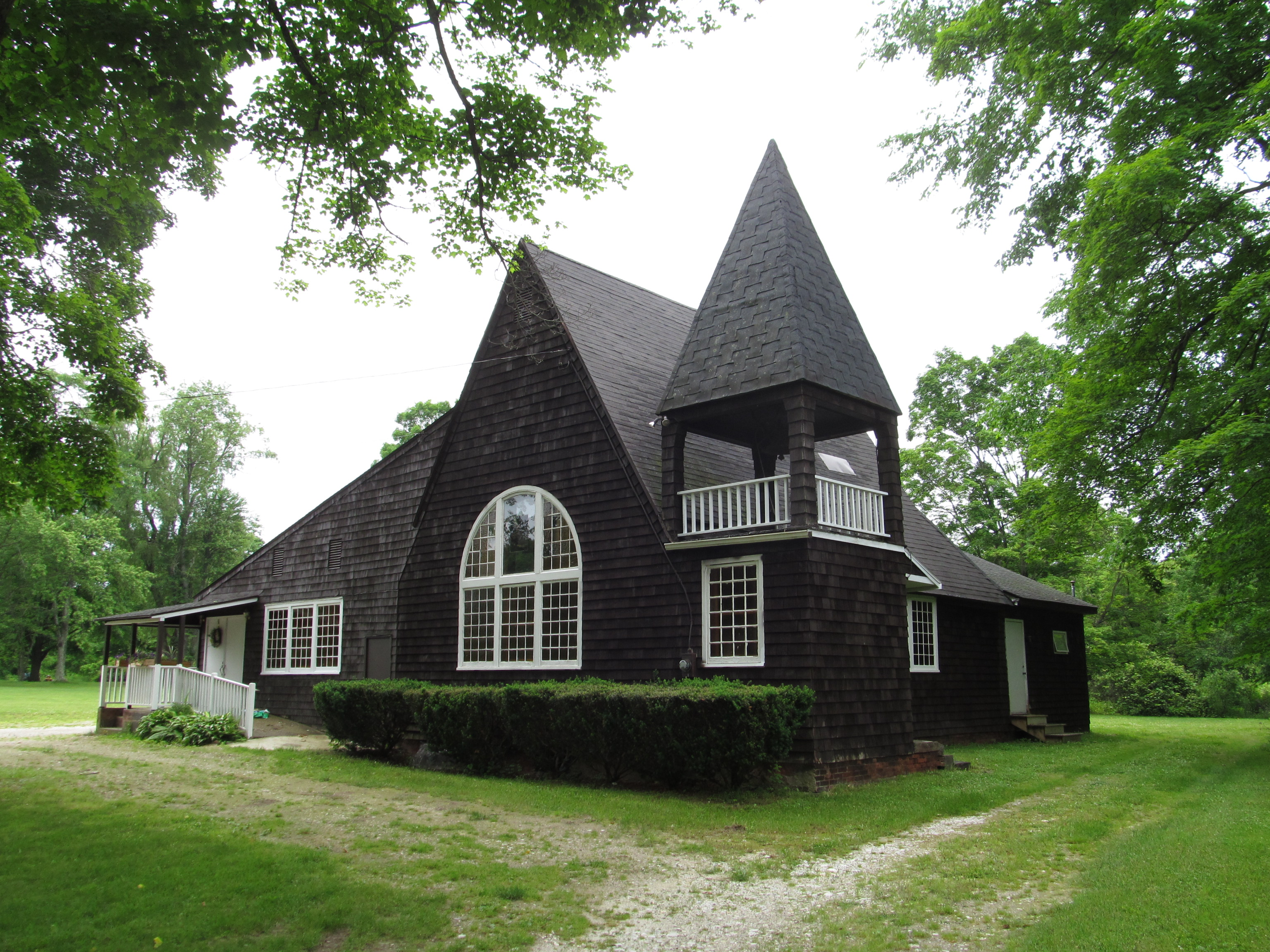
Clayton Church of God

Clayton, Massachusetts is the southernmost community in Berkshire County, Massachusetts. It is part of the town of New Marlborough.
