= Adonijah Bidwell =

Adonijah Bidwell was the first minister of Housatonic Township No. 1. He played a large role in the formation and upkeep of the Monterey, Massachusetts militia. Classically educated at Yale, he participated in the victorious Louisbourg, Nova Scotia expedition during the third French and Indian War. He is known today in part because his sermons and diary were preserved and give detailed insight into his life.

== Early life ==
Adonijah Bidwell was born in Hartford, Connecticut, in 1716. His father was Thomas Bidwell, a wealthy merchant and store owner involved in the triangular trade. His mother was Prudence Scott, the daughter of Edward Scott of New Haven. The year of Bidwell's birth in 1716, Thomas Bidwell was lost at sea. Adonijah had a comfortable childhood. As a young adult, Adonijah Bidwell attended Yale College and graduated in 1740. He was intermittently a teacher, a chaplain for the British and colonial expeditions to Canada and, finally, a full-time minister for Township No. 1 in Monterey, Massachusetts. He was said to be ordained in 1744.

== Career beginnings ==
In 1745 he was the chaplain on the William Pepperrell expedition to Louisbourg during King George's War and served on the ship, Defense in 1747. He chaplained other expeditions and ships between 1744 and 1747, and in 1748, accepted an offer to become the first minister of Township No. 1. He also taught at schools during this time; in 1746 at Wintonbury, in 1747 in Simsbury, and in 1747–1748 in West Hartford. He also preached, from 1747 to 1750 in West Simsbury (now Canton, Connecticut) and in 1749 in Kinderhook, New York.

His house, finished in 1750, was located north of the Township No. 1 Meeting House. The property was known as Deepwood Manse. The church formed on September 25, 1750, and he was installed pastor on October 3.

== Family life ==
In 1752, Adonijah Bidwell married Theodosia Colton of Suffield, Connecticut, a poet and the daughter of his former tutor. It was a childless marriage, and lasted until Theodosia's death in 1759 of unknown causes. A year after Theodosia died, he married Jemima Devotion of West Hartford, Connecticut, his second wife and a first cousin of Theodosia. They had four children: Adonijah the Younger, Barnabas Bidwell, Jemima Bidwell, and Theodosia Bidwell. Adonijah the Younger inherited the family farm, while Barnabas Bidwell became a member of the United States House of Representatives. He was later accused of embezzling money and fled to Canada. Jemima Devotion died in 1771. One year later, Reverend Bidwell married Ruth Kent of Suffield, Connecticut to take care of his four children. Ruth outlived the Reverend. After Adonijah's death, she married a Jonathan Judd, a second widower who was also a minister in Great Barrington. Upon his death in 1815, she lived with her brother and died at the age of 85.

== Church life and business ==
Bidwell's sermons were written by himself in shorthand and later preserved. As the minister of Housatonic Township No. 1, Bidwell would have been expected to write two sermons each week. Members of the church would congregate in the morning before taking a short break for midday meal. Those close enough would travel back to their houses for dinner, however, most would bring along lunch pails. The second sermon began around 1:00 p.m. and stretched late into the afternoon. Reverend Bidwell's sermons often dealt with love or forgiveness, however, his shorthand code is too complex to gain more than the basic feel of a sermon. The meetinghouse, badly constructed and only half finished when Adonijah arrived, was a poor place to hold service and town meetings. The space leaked and was bitterly cold in the wintertime. Eventually, it fell into an increasing state of disrepair and then burned down. All that remains are two foundation stones and the stone steps leading to the church. As the church slowly decayed, it is likely that Adonijah Bidwell would have held sermons in his own house, utilizing the 48 chairs listed in his death inventory. The Reverend had five punch bowls listed in this inventory. His large home may have accommodated travellers passing through Tyringham on the Boston–Albany Post Road which was located near the Meeting House.

== Bidwell the patriot ==
As tensions between the colonies and Britain escalated, Reverend Bidwell took the side of the patriots. He also often centered his sermons around freedom, penning them in a cryptographic code to disguise the language to potential readers. In 1776, Adonijah Bidwell bore his "full proportion toward... the War" for Independence at age 62. He sold beef to the troops, gave up his salary for four years so they could be paid, and loaned the town an additional £60 to pay the soldiers. The debt was never repaid. Despite his fervent patriotism, Adonijah Bidwell hung several portraits of the king in his house. Messengers and soldiers under the king's command would have often stopped by frontier outposts, therefore, pictures were needed to suggest loyalty to the king. Following the American victory, Adonijah died June 2, 1784 at age 68, leaving the farm and 1/3 of his possessions to his eldest son, Adonijah the Younger, as well as 1/3 of his worldly possessions to both Barnabas and widow Ruth.

== Museum ==
In 1990, the former home of Adonijah Bidwell was made into a museum furnished with 18th century furnishings which matched his 1784 death inventory. Historian John Demos has researched Bidwell and presented on his life in talks at the museum.

== Writings ==
- Bidwell, Adonijah. "Expedition to Cape Breton. Journal of the Rev. Adonijah Bidwell, Chaplain of the Fleet." New England Historical and Genealogical Register, 27 (April 1873), pp. 153–160.
- Adonijah Bidwell sermon booklets, circa 1754–1781. available at Congregational Library & Archives, Boston, MA, in two files, here and here
