= Kutsher's Hotel =

Resort in Thompson, New York

Coordinates: 41°42′07″N 74°41′28″W

Kutsher's in 1977

Kutsher's Hotel and Country Club in Thompson, Sullivan County, near the village of Monticello, New York, was the longest running of the Borscht Belt grand resorts in the Catskill Mountains region of New York. While the region was open to any and all visitors, the Borscht Belt was so named due to the largely Jewish-American clientele that made the Catskills the primary vacation destination for Jews in the northeastern United States.

Over the decades, performers such as David Brenner, Jerry Seinfeld, Louis Armstrong, Duke Ellington, Woody Allen and Joan Rivers appeared here. Rapper Ditch played here in 2012 as the final headlining set of the NY Harvest Festival, which had over 4,000 people watching. In 2013, a woman fell to her death from the rooftop of the hotel preparing for the 2013 NY Harvest Festival, which halted it and anything going forward at the hotel again. The hotel closed in 2013, and some of the buildings were demolished in 2014; only three remained as of early 2020. The site was sold, and a wellness resort was built there, opening in June 2018.

Helen and Milton Kutsher in 1977

== Establishment ==
Max and Louis Kutsher started the Kutsher's Brothers Farm House in 1907 and began expanding in the 1920s and 1930s. In the 1940s, at the request of his aunt Rebecca, Milton Kutsher took over the hotel. He oversaw the hotel's significant expansion from the 1950s to the 1980s, which created a premiere Catskills vacation destination: a "1,500 acres (607 ha) property that included a 400-room resort, condos, two bungalow colonies, two summer camps, an 18-hole golf course and lakefront." Milton Kutsher and his wife Helen (née Wasser) operated the hotels, with Helen serving as the head of reservations and doyenne of the resort. The two ran the hotel until Milton's death in 1998, at which point his son Mark took over management of the hotel.

== Sports ==
Milton Kutsher was active in sports circles, making the hotel the Catskills home of legendary Celtics coach Red Auerbach, Hall of Famer Wilt Chamberlain, who worked at Kutsher's as a bellhop, and Hall of Famer, Joe Lapchick, who played for the Original Celtics and coached the New York Knicks. There was the Maurice Stokes Benefit All-Star Game, a charity basketball game that once attracted the top pro players. Muhammad Ali trained at Kutsher's, as did other world boxing champions, such as Floyd Patterson and Leon Spinks. Kutsher was an avid sports fan, and also saw sports as a way to bring young people to the resort. The Maurice Stokes Game, which raised funds for the injured professional basketball player Maurice Stokes and raised funds for needy former players from the game's earlier days, was sponsored in part, by Kutsher's and played at either the hotel or the Kutsher's Sports Academy. The game is said to have "rivaled the NBA All-Star game in talent." In the 1990s, the basketball exhibition spawned the Maurice Stokes/Wilt Chamberlain Celebrity Pro-Am Golf Tournament.

Part of the hotel's empire included the Kutsher's Camp Anawana and Kutsher's Sports Academy.

In the 1950s, other hotels were focused on building indoor pools for their guests. Milton Kutsher insisted on building a golf course on the property instead of being part of a group planning on building a course in Loch Sheldrake together. He persevered and the “resort’s 6,843-yard greens became one of the top courses on the East Coast and a major draw for the hotel.”

Room 950 in 1977

== Accommodations and entertainment ==
In its heyday, the Borscht Belt resorts were home to premiere entertainment. Performers such as David Brenner, Louis Armstrong, Dean Martin, Woody Allen, and Jerry Seinfeld all spent their early career at Kutsher's.

The hotel offered an all-inclusive vacation: meals (all kosher) were included, as well as entertainment and activities. Activities available at the hotel included golf, tennis, indoor ice skating, indoor and outdoor pools, a health club, and various kids and teen programs. There were also winter sports such as snow tubing and downhill skiing.

== Decline ==
For many years there had been negotiations, which broke off in 2005, with the St. Regis Mohawks and Park Place Entertainment to develop an on-site casino. Kutsher's sent a letter to its long-time guests in November 2007 informing them there would be no availability for the coming summer, and Kutsher's would be closed for renovations. In late winter, early spring 2008, the Kutsher family entered into an option agreement with Louis Cappelli of Westchester County, New York to bring management changes and ownership of the hotel. The sale was not finalized, but renovations were carried out, and the establishment was re-opened as 'The New Kutsher's Resort & Spa'.

Kutsher's hosted the 2008, 2009 and 2010 U.S. edition of the All Tomorrow's Parties festival. It also served as the location for the annual district convention for New York's Kiwanis International and associated organizations.

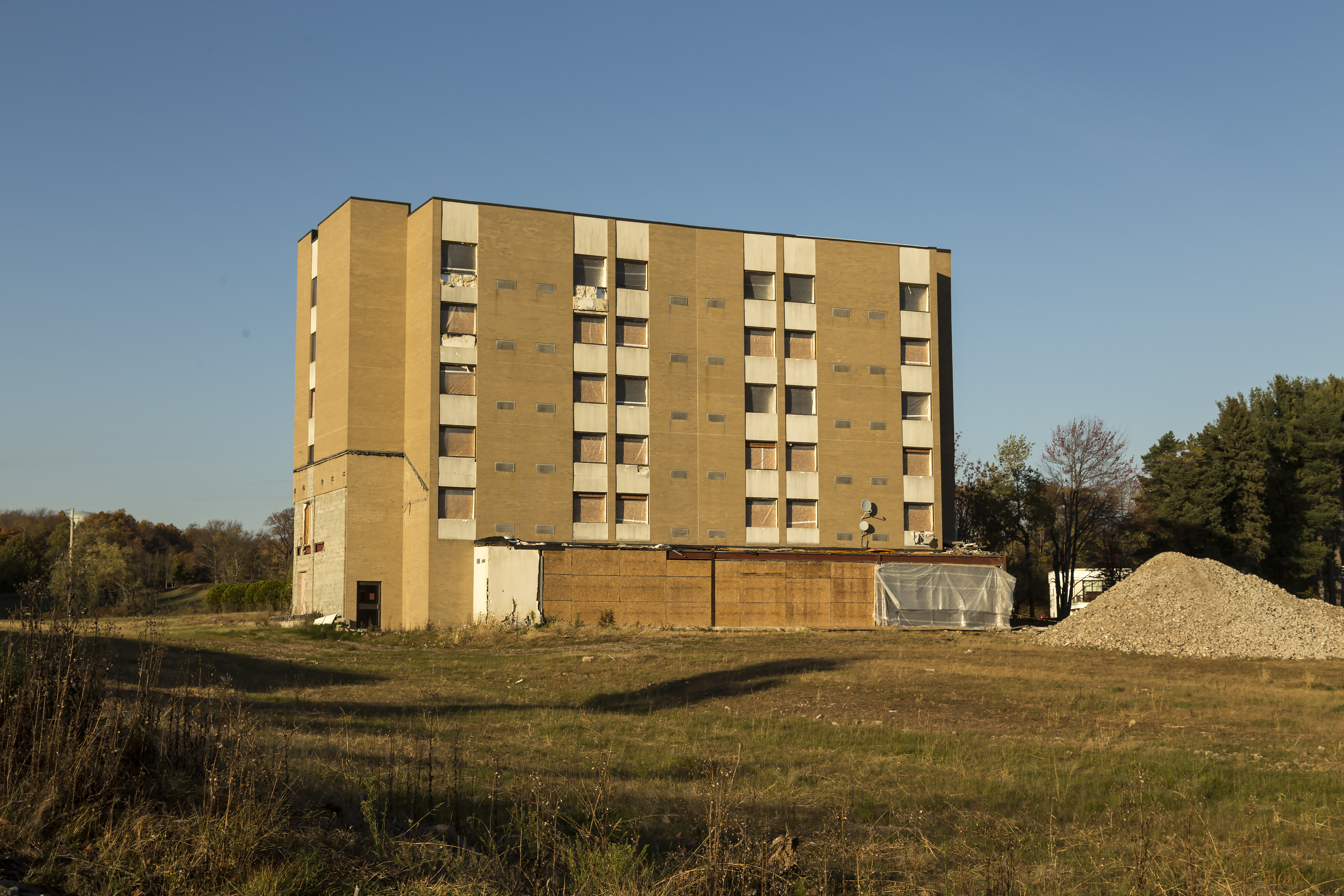
One of the last surviving Kutsher's buildings in 2015

Helen Kutsher died in Philadelphia, Pennsylvania on March 19, 2013.

Kutsher's closed in 2013. The property was sold to Veria Lifestyle, a company owned by Indian billionaire Subhash Chandra, for $8.8 million. The new owners started to demolish the hotel. During the demolition asbestos was encountered, delaying further work. Leaving part of the building there, the developers constructed a health and wellness destination based on the Indian discipline of yoga in another location. The resort was to include 131 rooms.

In June 2018, the YO1 Luxury Nature Cure, a six-story wellness resort, opened on another site.

== Legacy ==
A documentary about Kutsher's Country Club involving three generations of the Kutsher family titled Welcome to Kutsher's: The Last Catskills Resort was released in 2012.

== In popular culture ==
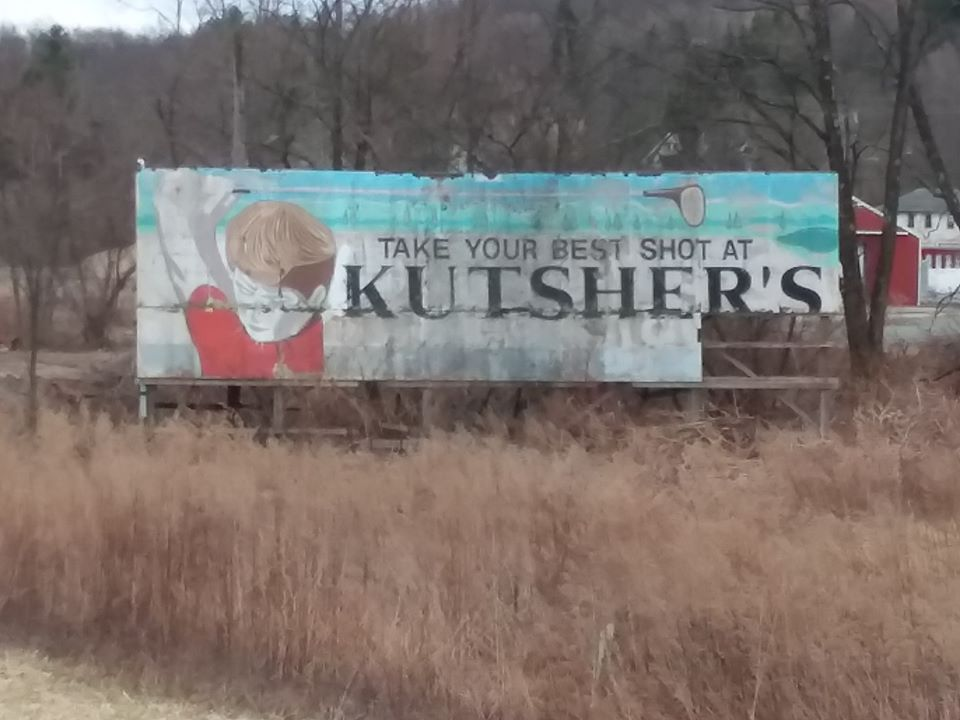
Surviving billboard for Kutsher's along NY 17 East near Liberty in 2020.

Kutsher's served as an inspiration for the 1987 movie Dirty Dancing.

In the film Wet Hot American Summer, the M.C. of the talent show worked at Kutsher's.

Kutsher's also appeared in the second season of The Marvelous Mrs. Maisel.
