= New Marlborough, Massachusetts =

- Town
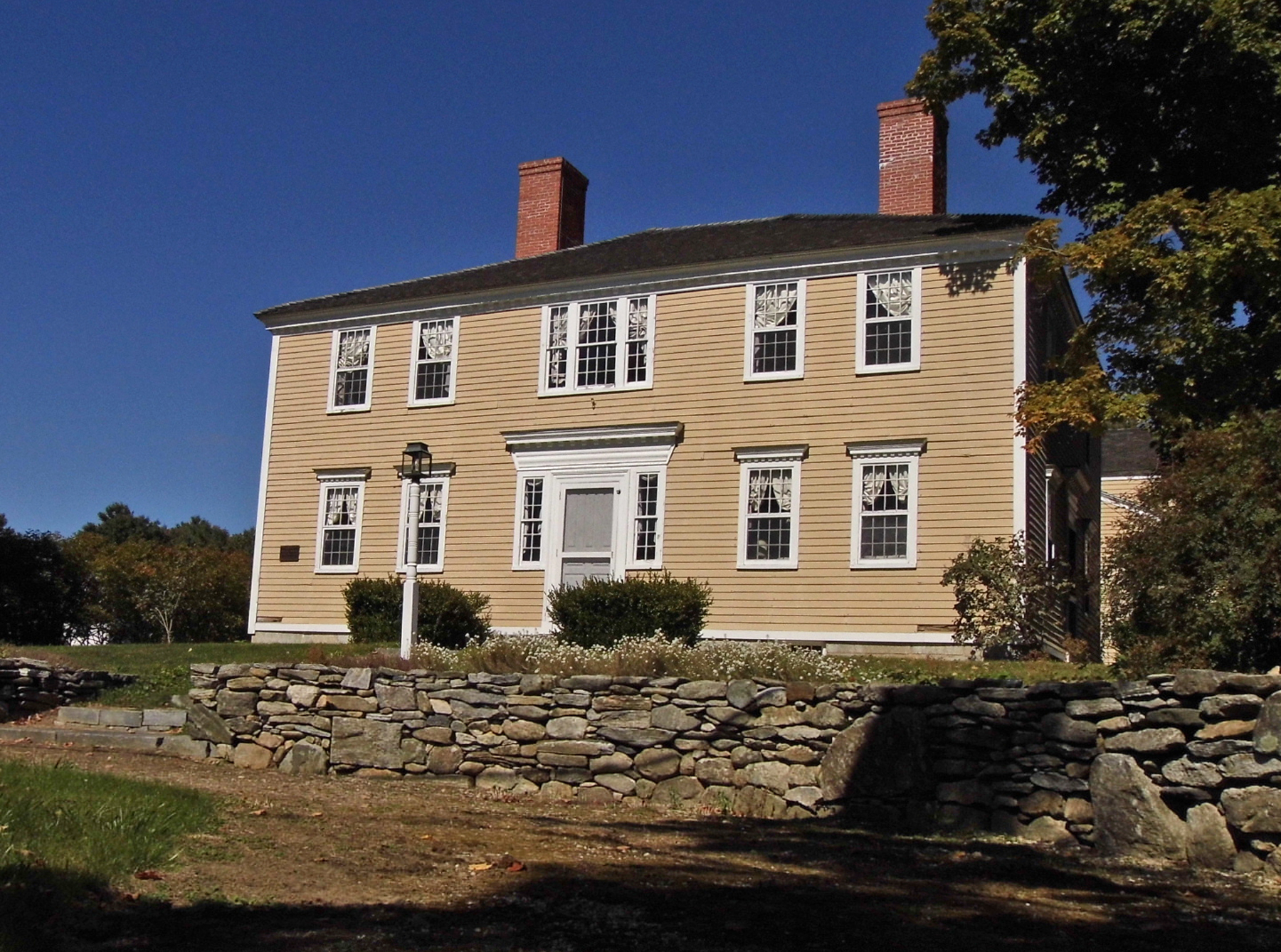
- The Thomas Shepard House in 2014

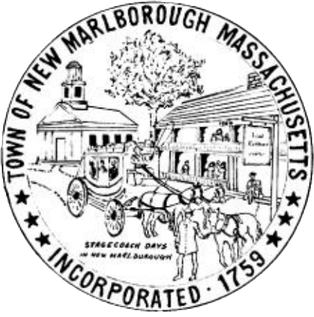
- Seal

- Location in Berkshire County and the state of Massachusetts.
- Coordinates: 42°07′22″N 73°13′45″W
- Country: United States
- State: Massachusetts
- County: Berkshire
- Settled: 1738
- Incorporated: 1759

Government
  - Type: Open town meeting

Area
  - Total: 47.9 sq mi (124.1 km^{2})
  - Land: 46.9 sq mi (121.4 km^{2})
  - Water: 1.0 sq mi (2.6 km^{2})
- Elevation: 1,352 ft (412 m)

Population (2020)
  - Total: 1,528
  - Density: 32.60/sq mi (12.59/km^{2})
- Time zone: UTC-5 (Eastern)
  - Summer (DST): UTC-4 (Eastern)
- ZIP Codes: 01230 (New Marlborough); 01244 (Mill River); 01259 (Southfield)
- Area code: 413
- FIPS code: 25-45420
- GNIS feature ID: 0618272
- Website: www.newmarlboroughma.gov

New Marlborough is a town in Berkshire County, Massachusetts, United States. It is part of the Pittsfield, Massachusetts Metropolitan Statistical Area. The population was 1,528 at the 2020 census. New Marlborough consists of five villages: Clayton, Hartsville, Mill River, New Marlborough Village and Southfield.

== History ==
New Marlborough was established as one of the four townships opened along the road between Sheffield and Westfield. The land was purchased from the local Native Americans (a band of Mohican Indians) by 72 proprietors from Marlborough, Massachusetts and vicinity, and the deed to the land was certified by the General Court in Boston in 1736. Most of the land was divided into 60-acre parcels for settlement, which started in 1739 and proceeded quickly during the 1740s. The town was officially incorporated in 1775, and named after the home town of the original proprietors. The town grew as a combination of agriculture in the area around the town center, and mills along the rivers in town. Today it is mostly rural, with little to no industry.

== Geography ==
According to the United States Census Bureau, the town has a total area of 47.9 square miles (124.1 km^{2}), of which 46.9 square miles (121.4 km^{2}) is land and 1.0 square mile (2.6 km^{2}), or 2.12%, is water. New Marlborough is bordered on the north by Monterey, on the east by Sandisfield, on the south by Norfolk and North Canaan, Connecticut, on the west by Sheffield, and on the northwest by Great Barrington. New Marlborough is located 26 miles (42 km) south of Pittsfield, 42 miles (68 km) west of Springfield and 128 miles (206 km) west-southwest of Boston.

New Marlborough is located in the lower Berkshires, dotted by several peaks. Several rivers, including the Konkapot River, Umpachene River, and Whiting River, flow through the town, all of which feed into the Housatonic River. There are also several swamps and ponds, including Lake Buel on the Monterey line, and the Thousand Acre Swamp in the southeast corner. The swamp lies along the border of Campbells Falls State Park, named for the falls along the Whiting River. Parts of Sandisfield State Forest also lie in the town.

The town lies along Massachusetts Route 183, which passes from Lenox and Great Barrington towards Sandisfield and the Connecticut border. For the northern half of the route, Route 183 is combined with Route 57, which splits near the geographic center of town to head east towards Sandisfield and its eventual terminus in Agawam.

The nearest interstate, Interstate 90 (the Massachusetts Turnpike) passes several miles north of the town, with the nearest exit, Exit 2 in Lee, being 15 miles (24 km) away. The nearest bus service is in Great Barrington, and the nearest rail service (along the Lake Shore Line of Amtrak) is in Pittsfield. The nearest small airport is in Great Barrington, with the nearest national air service being at Bradley International Airport in Windsor Locks, Connecticut.

== Demographics ==
Historical population
Year	Pop.	±%
1790	1,550	—
1850	1,847	+19.2%
1860	1,782	−3.5%
1870	1,855	+4.1%
1880	1,876	+1.1%
1890	1,305	−30.4%
1900	1,282	−1.8%
1910	1,124	−12.3%
1920	1,010	−10.1%
1930	864	−14.5%
1940	956	+10.6%
1950	989	+3.5%
1960	1,083	+9.5%
1970	1,031	−4.8%
1980	1,160	+12.5%
1990	1,240	+6.9%
2000	1,494	+20.5%
2010	1,509	+1.0%
2020	1,528	+1.3%
2022*	1,510	−1.2%
* = population estimate. Source: United States census records and Population Estimates Program data.

As of the census of 2000, there were 1,494 people, 582 households, and 403 families residing in the town. By population, the town ranks 17th out of the 32 cities and towns in Berkshire County, and 307th out of the 351 cities and towns in Massachusetts. The population density was 31.7 inhabitants per square mile (12.2/km^{2}), which ranks 23rd in the county and 329th in the Commonwealth. There were 963 housing units at an average density of 20.4 per square mile (7.9/km^{2}). The racial makeup of the town was 97.52% White, 1.67% African American, 0.13% Asian, 0.13% from other races, and 0.54% from two or more races. Hispanic or Latino of any race were 1.14% of the population.

There were 582 households, out of which 28.5% had children under the age of 18 living with them, 58.1% were married couples living together, 6.5% had a female householder with no husband present, and 30.6% were non-families. 25.1% of all households were made up of individuals, and 8.8% had someone living alone who was 65 years of age or older. The average household size was 2.42 and the average family size was 2.88.

In the town, the population was spread out, with 24.7% under the age of 18, 6.6% from 18 to 24, 25.2% from 25 to 44, 29.0% from 45 to 64, and 14.5% who were 65 years of age or older. The median age was 41 years. For every 100 females, there were 106.4 males. For every 100 females age 18 and over, there were 104.5 males.

The median income for a household in the town was $46,875, and the median income for a family was $56,944. Males had a median income of $34,205 versus $25,972 for females. The per capita income for the town was $25,658. About 3.7% of families and 6.4% of the population were below the poverty line, including 8.7% of those under age 18 and 7.1% of those age 65 or over.

== Government ==
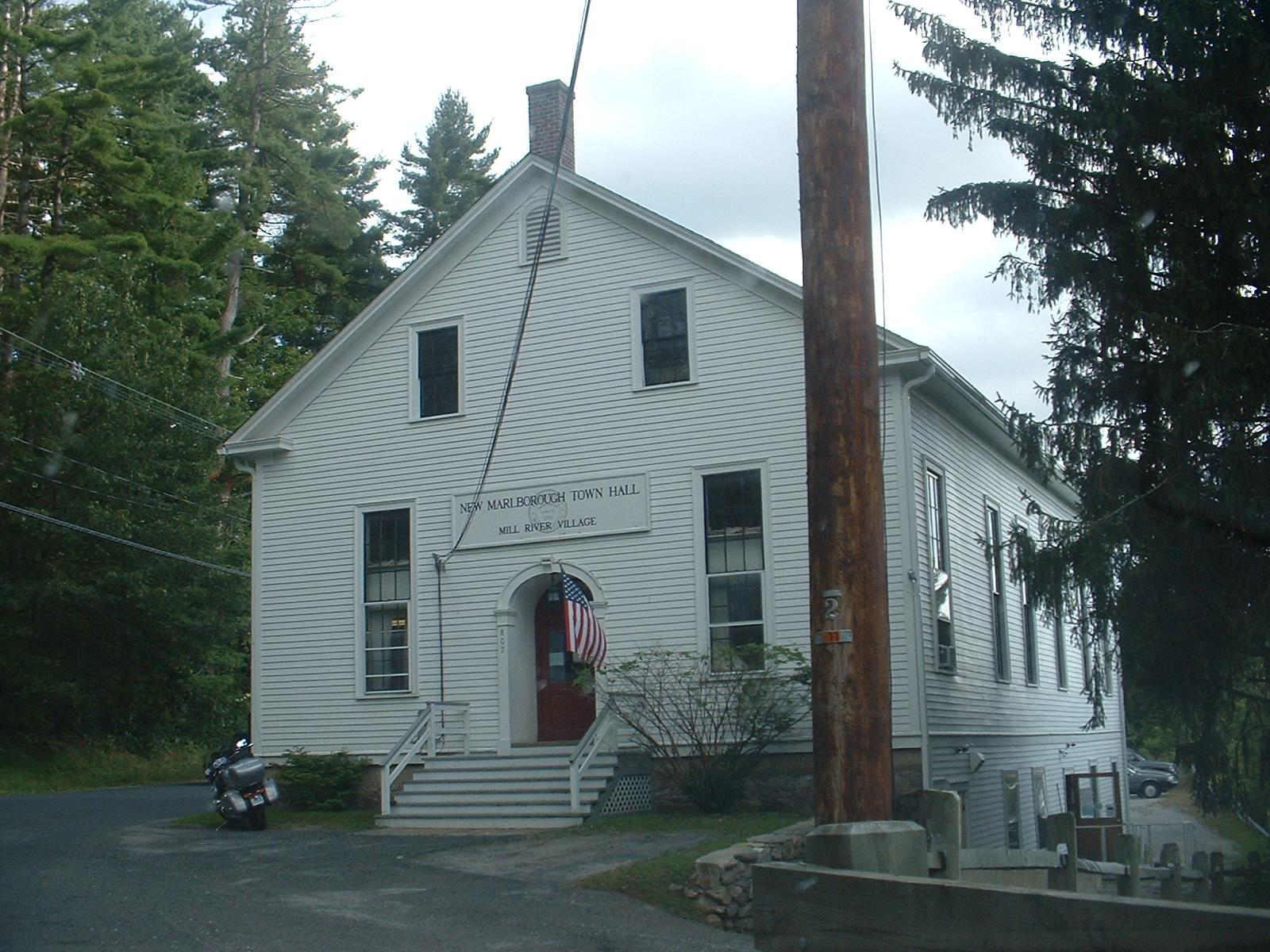
New Marlborough Town Hall

New Marlborough employs the open town meeting form of government, and is led by a board of selectmen and an executive assistant. The town has its own police, fire and public works departments. The town library, located in Mill River, is connected to the regional library network, and the town has two post offices, in Mill River and Southfield. The nearest hospital, Fairview Hospital, is in neighboring Great Barrington.

On the state level, New Marlborough is represented in the Massachusetts House of Representatives by the Fourth Berkshire district, which covers southern Berkshire County, as well as the westernmost towns in Hampden County. In the Massachusetts Senate, the town is represented by the Berkshire, Hampshire and Franklin district, which includes all of Berkshire County and western Hampshire and Franklin counties. The town is patrolled by the First (Lee) Station of Barracks "B" of the Massachusetts State Police.

On the national level, New Marlborough is represented in the United States House of Representatives as part of Massachusetts's 1st congressional district, and has been represented by Richard Neal of Springfield since January 2013; it was previously represented by John Olver of Amherst between 1991 and 2013. Massachusetts is currently represented in the United States Senate by senators Elizabeth Warren and Ed Markey.

== Education ==
New Marlborough is part of the Southern Berkshire Regional School District along with Alford, Egremont, Monterey, Mount Washington, and Sheffield. Students in New Marlborough attend the New Marlborough Central School for kindergarten and first grades, with second through sixth grades attending the Undermountain Elementary School in Sheffield, and Mount Everett Regional High School in Sheffield for grades 7–12. Additionally, there are private schools in Sheffield, Great Barrington and Salisbury, Connecticut. There are private schools in Great Barrington and other nearby towns.

The nearest community college is the South County Center of Berkshire Community College in Great Barrington. The nearest state college is Westfield State University. The nearest private colleges are University of Saint Joseph and University of Hartford, both located in West Hartford, Connecticut.
