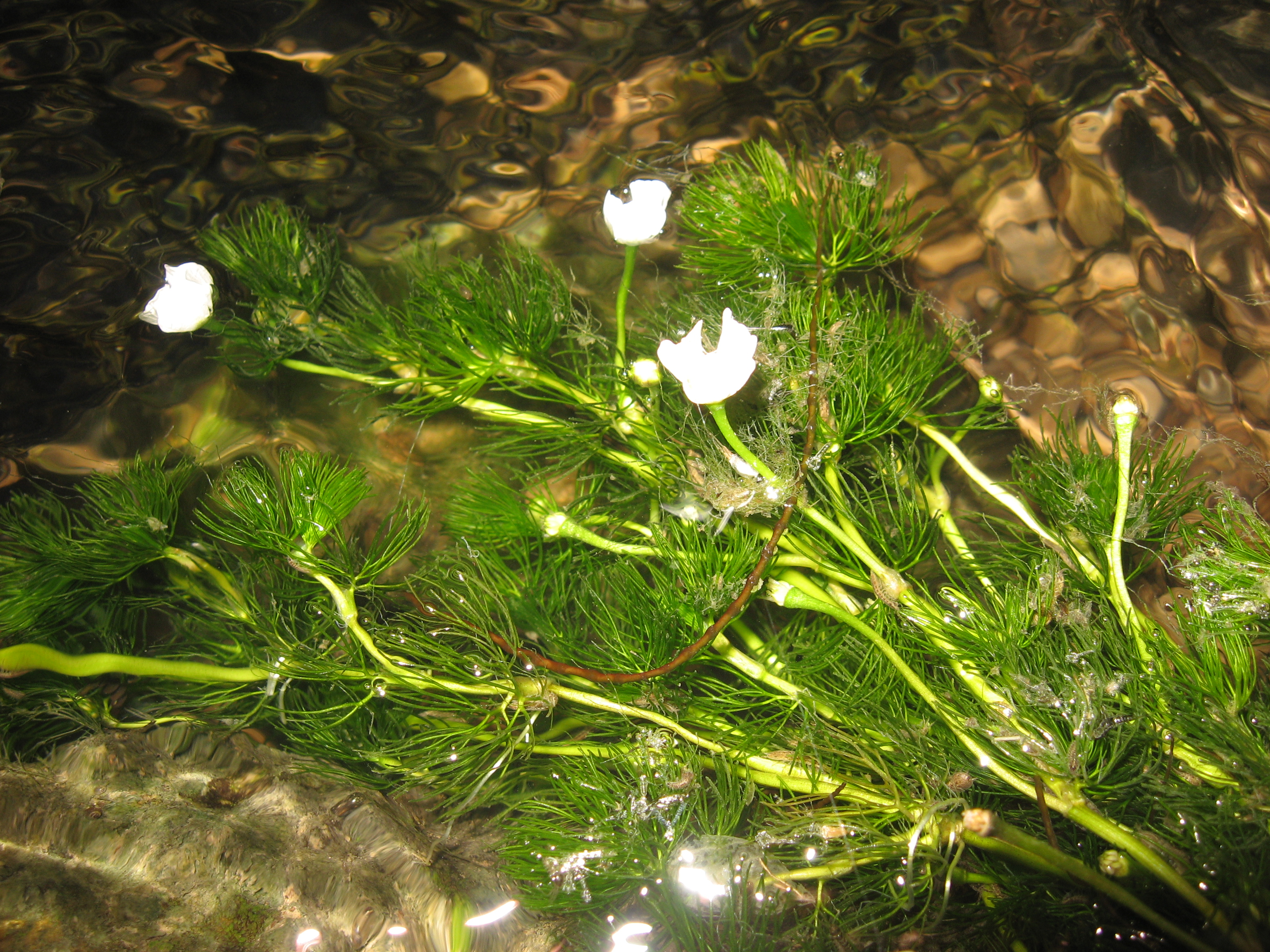

Scientific classification
- Kingdom: Plantae
- Clade: Tracheophytes
- Clade: Angiosperms
- Clade: Eudicots
- Order: Ranunculales
- Family: Ranunculaceae
- Genus: Ranunculus
- Species: R. longirostris

Binomial name
- Ranunculus longirostris Godr.

Synonyms
- Batrachium circinatum (Sibth.) Rchb.; Batrachium circinatum (Sibth.) Rchb. ssp. subrigidum (W. Drew) Á. Löve & D. Löve; Batrachium longirostre (Godr.) F.W. Schultz; Ranunculus amphibius James; Ranunculus aquatilis L. var. diffusus With. p.p.; Ranunculus aquatilis L. var. longirostris (Godr.) G. Lawson; Ranunculus aquatilis L. var. subrigidus (W. Drew) Breitung; Ranunculus circinatus auct. non Sibth.; Ranunculus circinatus Sibth. var. subrigidus (W. Drew) L.D. Benson; Ranunculus subrigidus W. Drew; Ranunculus usneoides Greene

= Ranunculus longirostris =

Species of aquatic plant

Ranunculus longirostris, the longbeak buttercup, is an aquatic plant in the buttercup family.

This species is native to Canada and the United States, where it is widespread. However, it is absent from most of the Southeastern United States. It is found in a diversity of freshwater aquatic habitats, often in streams with slow moving water.

There has been some difficulty in separating this species from the closely related Ranunculus trichophyllus, due in part to the lack of preservation of critical features on herbarium specimens.
