= Lake Garfield =

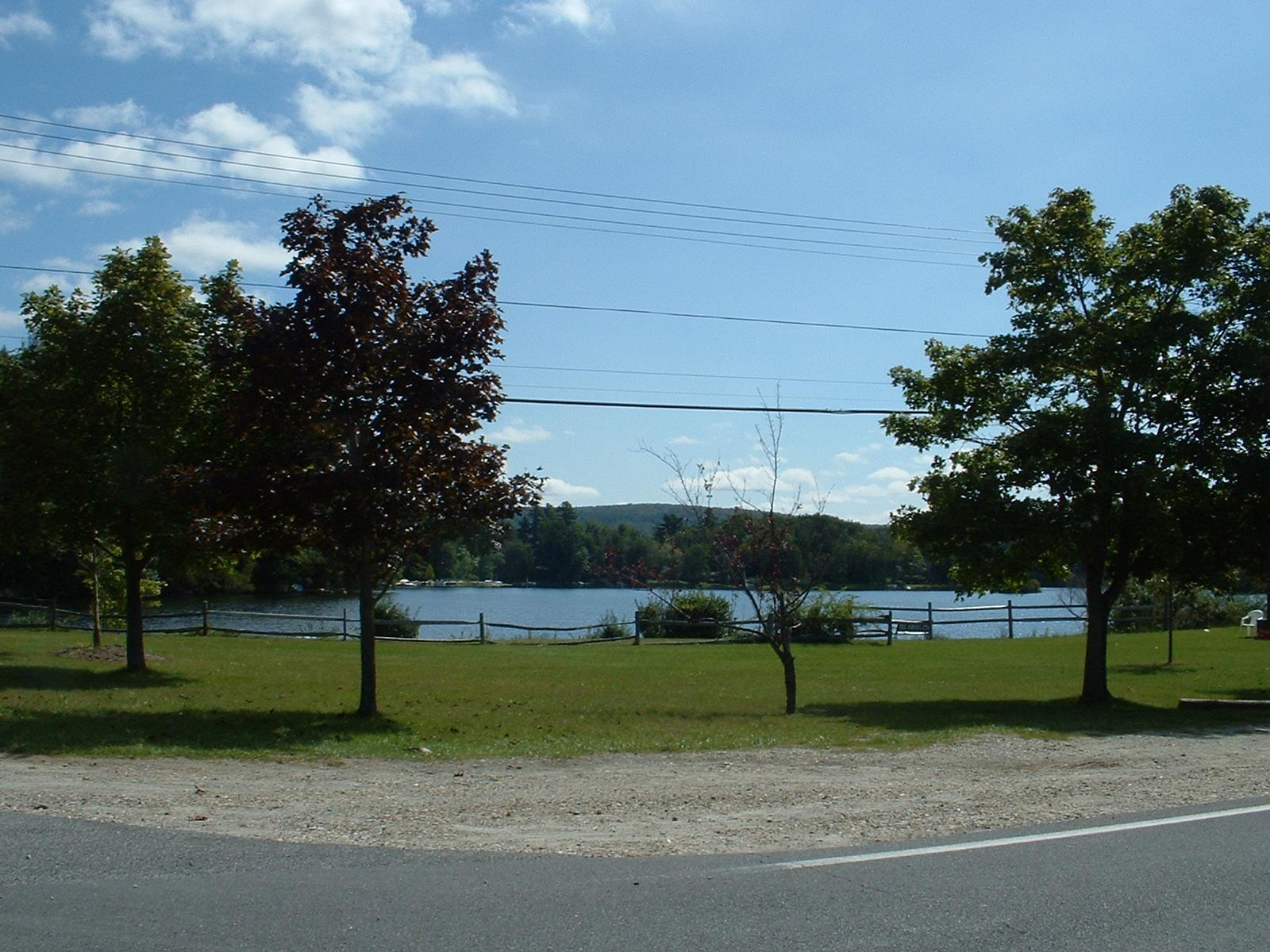

- Location within Massachusetts Location within the United States
- Location: Berkshire County, Massachusetts, U.S.
- Coordinates: 42°10′59″N 73°11′53″W
- Type: Reservoir
- Basin countries: United States
- Surface area: 275 acres (111 ha)
- Average depth: 16 ft (4.9 m)
- Max. depth: 35 ft (11 m)
- Surface elevation: 1,283 ft (391 m)
- Dam: Lake Garfield Dam
- Settlements: Monterey

Lake Garfield is a 275-acre (111 ha) lake located about 0.5 miles (0.80 km) north of the center of Monterey, off Route 23 in Berkshire County, Massachusetts.

== Overview ==
At the furthest western point of the lake near Tyringham Road, a public boat ramp and parking lot can be found. The town of Monterey makes these amenities unavailable during the period of June 15 through September 6 because of swimming season. A 1979 survey recorded a total of 12 species of fish inside Lake Garfield: smallmouth bass, largemouth bass, pumpkinseed, yellow perch, chain pickerel, rainbow trout, golden shiner, brown bullhead, bluegill, white sucker, rock bass and white perch. Lake Garfield is a popular fishing site for rainbow trout during spring. Due to the dominant yellow and white perch population, gamefish are usually below average size and abundance although a good bass or pickerel may occasionally be produced by the lake.

Lake Garfield was named for a local family.
