= Monterey, Massachusetts =

- Town
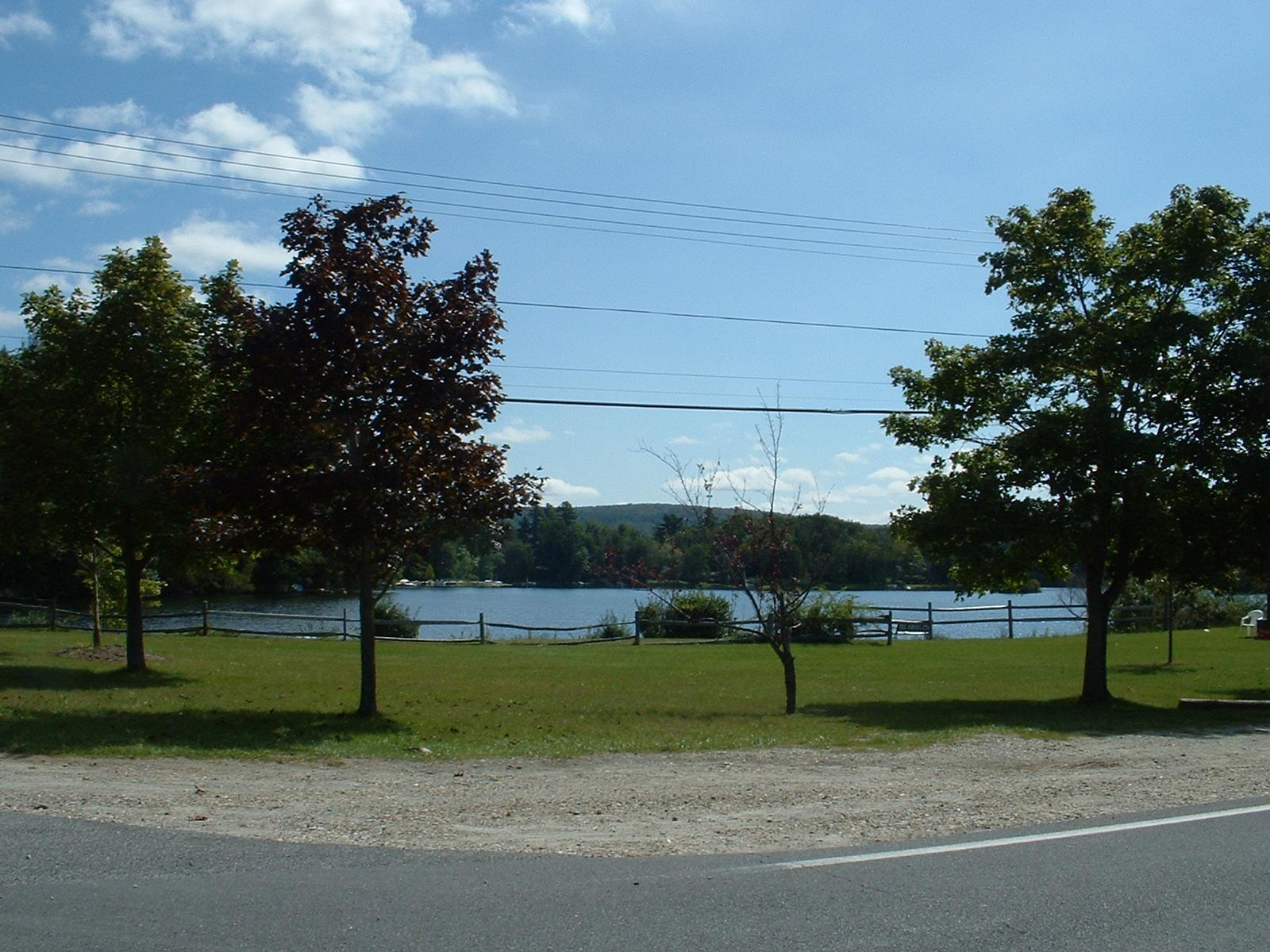
- Lake Garfield

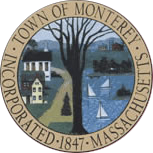
- Seal

- Location in Berkshire County and the state of Massachusetts.
- Coordinates: 42°10′45″N 73°12′45″W
- Country: United States
- State: Massachusetts
- County: Berkshire
- Settled: 1739
- Incorporated: 1847

Government
  - Type: Open town meeting

Area
  - Total: 27.4 sq mi (71.0 km^{2})
  - Land: 26.4 sq mi (68.5 km^{2})
  - Water: 0.97 sq mi (2.5 km^{2})
- Elevation: 1,243 ft (379 m)

Population (2020)
  - Total: 1,095
  - Density: 41.4/sq mi (16.0/km^{2})
- Time zone: UTC-5 (Eastern)
  - Summer (DST): UTC-4 (Eastern)
- ZIP Codes: 01245 (Monterey); 01230 (Great Barrington)
- Area code: 413
- FIPS code: 25-42460
- GNIS feature ID: 0618270
- Website: www.montereyma.gov

Monterey is a small town in Berkshire County, Massachusetts, United States. It is part of the Pittsfield, Massachusetts Metropolitan Statistical Area. The population was 1,095 at the 2020 census.

== History ==
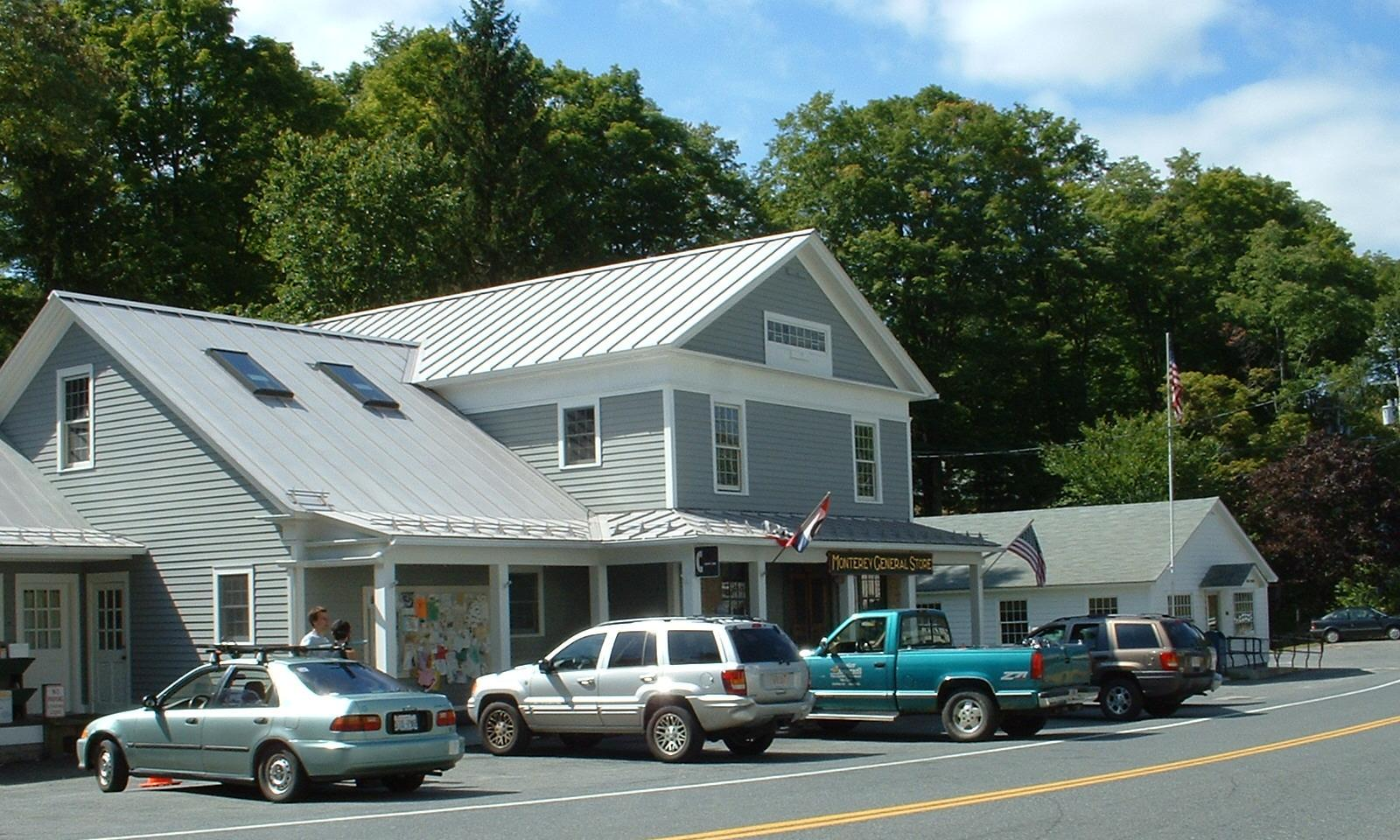
Monterey General Store, with the post office to the right

Prior to settlement by European-American colonists, the area of Monterey was inhabited by Mahicans, the local Native American tribe. Monterey was first settled by colonists in 1739 as a part of Housatonic Township Number One. The township had two villages, one along Hop Brook to the north (modern Tyringham) and one on the Konkapot River in the south (modern Monterey). The township was officially incorporated as Tyringham in 1767. In the earliest days of 1776, General Henry Knox passed through with cannons from Fort Ticonderoga in New York to aid in ending the Siege of Boston. Today, the path he took is known as the Henry Knox Trail.

The long distance between the two villages led to the division of the township in 1847. The new township, previously the village called Green Woods or South Tyringham, was voted by residents to be named Monterey to commemorate the Battle of Monterey that took place a year earlier in the Mexican–American War. Palo Alto and Buena Vista were also considered, but thought to be "too foreign sounding". The town was mostly known for its sawmills, but today it is a rural community, known more for its recreational areas in the state forests and along Lake Garfield.

== Geography ==
According to the United States Census Bureau, the town has a total area of 27.4 square miles (71.0 km^{2}), of which 26.4 square miles (68.5 km^{2}) is land and 0.97 square miles (2.5 km^{2}), or 3.53%, is water. Monterey is bordered by Tyringham to the north, Otis to the east, Sandisfield to the southeast, New Marlborough to the south, and Great Barrington to the west. Monterey lies 21 miles (34 km) south-southeast of Pittsfield, 37 miles (60 km) west of Springfield, and 124 miles (200 km) west of Boston.

Monterey lies in the southern end of the Berkshires, at the headwaters of the Konkapot River. The river rises from Lake Garfield, which is surrounded by several hills, and Lake Buel, which lies along the New Marlborough town line. Much of the northwest corner of town is dominated by Mount Wilcox and the lower portion of Beartown State Forest. The state forest is crossed by the Appalachian Trail, which crosses from Great Barrington, below the peak of the mountain, and on to Sky Hill in Tyringham.

Monterey lies along Massachusetts Route 23, the main east-west route through town. Near the Great Barrington line, Route 57 begins and heads eastward, passing Lake Buel before heading into New Marlborough. Route 57 also carries Route 183, which is combined with Route 23 west of the junction, southward towards Connecticut. There are also several non-state highways which connect the town to its other neighbors. Most of the population is centered around Route 23, especially near Lake Garfield.

The nearest interstate, Interstate 90 (the Massachusetts Turnpike), passes through neighboring Otis, and its nearest exit is at U.S. Route 20 in Lee. The nearest regional rail and bus service is at Great Barrington, which is at the end of a weekend service line to New York City via the MTA rail line (note: this refers to a discontinued connecting bus service to GB from the MTA's Wassaic, NY station). Amtrak service can also be found in Pittsfield, along the east-west Lake Shore Limited. There is a small regional airport in Great Barrington, The Walter J Koladza Airport, but it is limited to private flights and scenic tours. The nearest national air service at Bradley International Airport in Windsor Locks, Connecticut.

== Demographics ==
Historical population
| Year | Pop. | ±% |
|---|---|---|
| 1850 | 761 | — |
| 1860 | 758 | −0.4% |
| 1870 | 653 | −13.9% |
| 1880 | 635 | −2.8% |
| 1890 | 495 | −22.0% |
| 1900 | 455 | −8.1% |
| 1910 | 388 | −14.7% |
| 1920 | 282 | −27.3% |
| 1930 | 321 | +13.8% |
| 1940 | 320 | −0.3% |
| 1950 | 367 | +14.7% |
| 1960 | 480 | +30.8% |
| 1970 | 600 | +25.0% |
| 1980 | 818 | +36.3% |
| 1990 | 805 | −1.6% |
| 2000 | 934 | +16.0% |
| 2010 | 961 | +2.9% |
| 2020 | 1,095 | +13.9% |
| 2022* | 1,085 | −0.9% |
* = population estimate. Source: United States census records and Population Estimates Program data.

As of the census of 2000, there were 934 people, 387 households, and 239 families residing in the town. By population, the town ranks 21st out of the 32 cities and towns in Berkshire County, and 325th out of 351 cities and towns in Massachusetts. The population density was 35.2 inhabitants per square mile (13.6/km^{2}), which ranks it 20th in the county and 325th in the Commonwealth. There were 830 housing units at an average density of 31.3 per square mile (12.1/km^{2}). The racial makeup of the town was 96.90% White, 0.54% African American, 0.21% Native American, 0.32% Asian, 0.21% Pacific Islander, 0.75% from other races, and 1.07% from two or more races. Hispanic or Latino of any race were 1.50% of the population.

There were 387 households, out of which 23.8% had children under the age of 18 living with them, 51.9% were married couples living together, 8.0% had a female householder with no husband present, and 38.0% were non-families. 27.9% of all households were made up of individuals, and 8.5% had someone living alone who was 65 years of age or older. The average household size was 2.21 and the average family size was 2.74.

In the town, the population was spread out, with 17.2% under the age of 18, 8.6% from 18 to 24, 24.6% from 25 to 44, 33.1% from 45 to 64, and 16.5% who were 65 years of age or older. The median age was 44 years. For every 100 females, there were 91.0 males. For every 100 females age 18 and over, there were 92.8 males.

The median income for a household in the town was $49,750, and the median income for a family was $59,643. Males had a median income of $37,692 versus $22,656 for females. The per capita income for the town was $30,992. About 3.4% of families and 9.0% of the population were below the poverty line, including 6.3% of those under age 18 and 5.3% of those age 65 or over.

== Government ==
Monterey employs the open town meeting form of government, and is led by a board of selectmen. The town hall, police and fire departments are located in the central village, as is the town post office. The town's public library is a WiFi hot spot, and is a member of the regional library system. The nearest hospital, Fairview Hospital, is in neighboring Great Barrington.

On the state level, Monterey is represented in the Massachusetts House of Representatives by the Fourth Berkshire district, which covers southern Berkshire County, as well as the westernmost towns in Hampden County. In the Massachusetts Senate, the town is represented by the Berkshire, Hampshire and Franklin district, which includes all of Berkshire County and western Hampshire and Franklin counties. The town is patrolled by the Monterey Police Department.

The Monterey Fire Department is a paid by call fire department that consists of approximately 25 members and one ladder truck, one engine/tanker, two rescues, one brush truck, and a rescue boat. The department responds to all emergency calls in the town, including fire and medical emergencies. The department also will provide mutual aid to surrounding towns when requested. The town firefighters train weekly and are all certified to the First Responder level. The department responds to approximately 150–200 calls per year.

On the national level, Monterey is represented in the United States House of Representatives as part of Massachusetts's 1st congressional district, and has been represented by Richard Neal of Springfield since the redistricting in 2013. Massachusetts is currently represented in the United States Senate by senior Senator Elizabeth Warren and junior Senator Ed Markey.

== Education ==
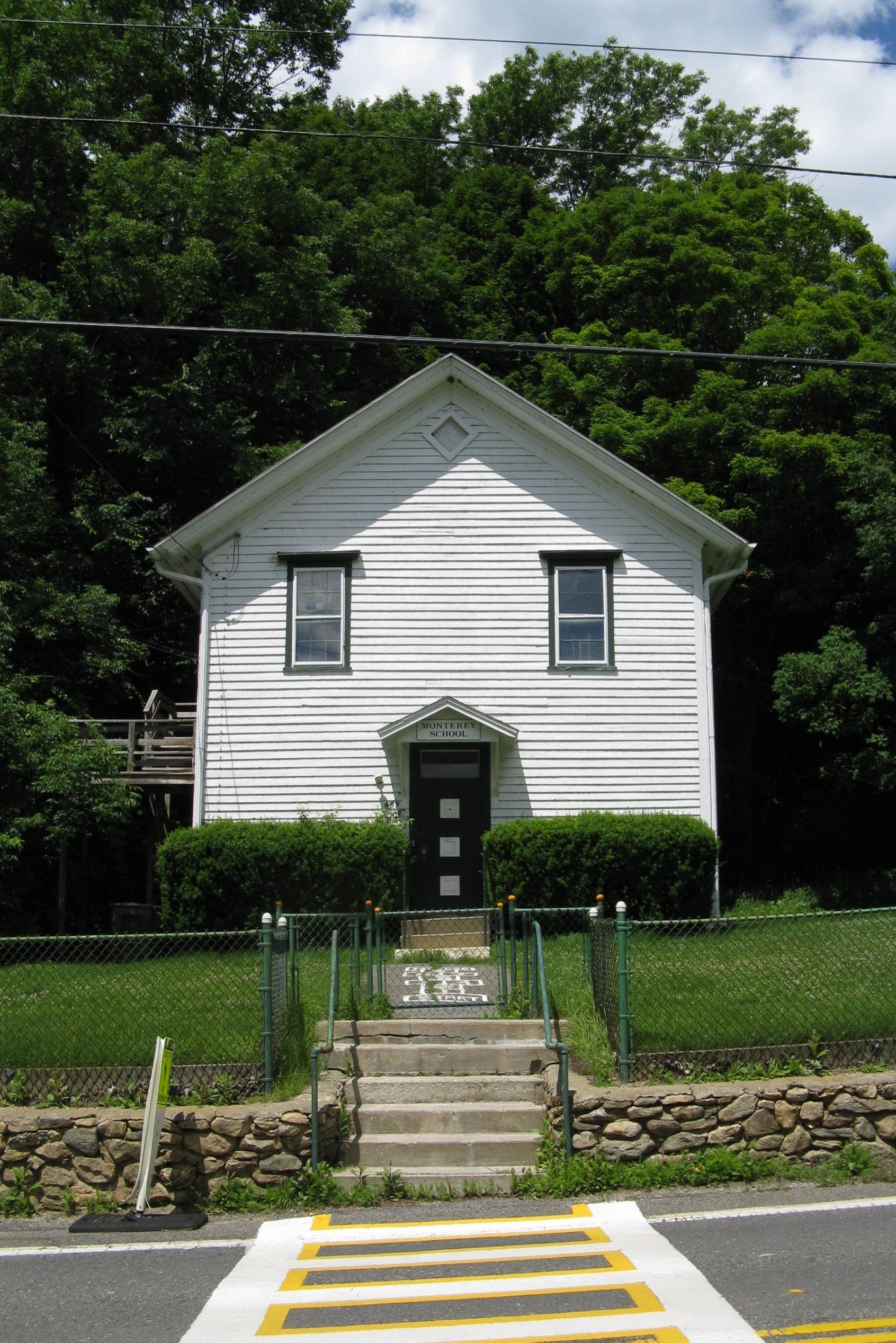
Monterey School

Monterey is part of the Southern Berkshire Regional School District along with Alford, Egremont, Mount Washington, New Marlborough, and Sheffield. Students in Monterey attend the Monterey School for kindergarten and first grades, with second through sixth grades attending the Undermountain Elementary School in Sheffield, and Mount Everett Regional High School in Sheffield for grades 7–12. There are private schools in Great Barrington and other nearby towns.

The nearest community college is the South County Center of Berkshire Community College in Great Barrington. The nearest state college is Westfield State University, and the nearest state university is the University of Massachusetts Amherst. The nearest private colleges are Williams College in Williamstown and Smith College in Northampton.

== Notable people ==
- Karen Allen, actress
- Edwin N. Chapin (1823–1896), postmaster and newspaper publisher
- Florence L. Lattimore (1896–1956), writer and social worker

== Sites of interest ==
- Bidwell House Museum
