= Wasque =

Nature reserve in Massachusetts, US

Coordinates: 41°21′5″N 70°27′28″W

Wasque (/ˈweɪskwiː/, "way-squee") or Wasque Beach is a 200-acre (0.81 km^{2}) nature reserve on Chappaquiddick Island, Martha's Vineyard, Massachusetts. The site was established as a reservation for the public in 1967 and is one of five conservation areas on "the Vineyard" managed by the Trustees of Reservations. Wasque contains a sandy strand the Boston Globe calls "a magnificent beach." Travel + Leisure named Wasque Beach the number one beach in New England and WHDH-TV reports "It's pristine, serene, and rain or shine, it's a beach-goers' delight." Off the shore of Wasque Beach is Katama Bay, "a vast and pristine salt water bay that includes many acres of productive shellfish beds."

== Ecology ==
Wasque has a sand barrens ecosystem. One of a number of such habitats in isolated locations from Maine to New Jersey, the reservation's landscape and geography were formed by ancient outwash deposits from glacial till. The free-draining, acidic, dry, and sandy soil sustains coastal heathlands, oak and pitch pine woodlands, and sandplain grasslands. Wasque is home to such species as beach plum, bearberry, blackberry, black huckleberry, blue toadflax, bluets, chokeberry, dwarf cinquefoil, golden heather, late lowbush blueberry, Nantucket shadbush, rockrose, and yellow stargrass. These areas are "globally rare communities" and only maintained through relatively intensive land management that includes domesticated animals grazing the grass, mechanical mowing and clearing of vegetation, and even controlled burning.

The reservation has a number of rare animal species that depend on the conditions of these habitats; in 2004 The Boston Globe said that the Wasque Reservation is "a great place for fishing and birdwatching". Observers can spot blue herons, egrets, ducks, and migrating shorebirds that can be found in the marshes. Ospreys can be seen swooping down to pluck fish from the Atlantic Ocean. Butterfly watchers can see monarchs, sulphur butterflies, and red admirals that stop here to drink nectar from wildflowers before continuing their southward migration.

== History ==
Algonquian people camped at this site in warm weather; the name is said to come from wannasque, an Algonquian word meaning "the ending". European settlement came to this part of Chappaquiddick Island in 1750 or later. Several 19th-century land speculation proposals never came to fruition. "Chappaquiddick-by-the-Sea," one failed concept for land development, would have included a grid of 750 quarter-acre parcels, broad avenues, public parks, and yacht facilities. In 1967, when the property was purchased for the public, there were only a few homes in the area.

== Visiting ==
Relatively remote, this "little-known" beach and nature reserve is about 70 miles south of Boston off the coast of Cape Cod. Martha's Vineyard is a short Steamship Authority ferry ride from mainland Cape Cod, out of Falmouth or Woods Hole. Bicycles and motor vehicles may be transported on the ferry for additional fees. A ferry from Edgartown on the Vineyard allows one to get to Chappaquiddick. The property is open 24 hours a day all year. Due to severe beach erosion at Wasque Point, one is no longer allowed to take vehicles over the sand to Wasque from adjacent Cape Poge Wildlife Refuge. Formerly this was allowed except for occasional summer closures to protect the nest sites of rare shorebirds.

Wasque is a great place for recreational fishing. Recent reports of fishing off Wasque Beach have mentioned bonito that were reeled in at the Wasque rip and Menemsha jetties. Bluefish and 10-15 lbs. Striped bass have been reported as well. In some years, the waters off Wasque Beach have been "hot with both game species." At times, dedicated anglers have come to the Wasque just to sit in their vehicles “watching the water for signs” that fishing conditions were favorable.
