= South End Lower Roxbury Open Space Land Trust =

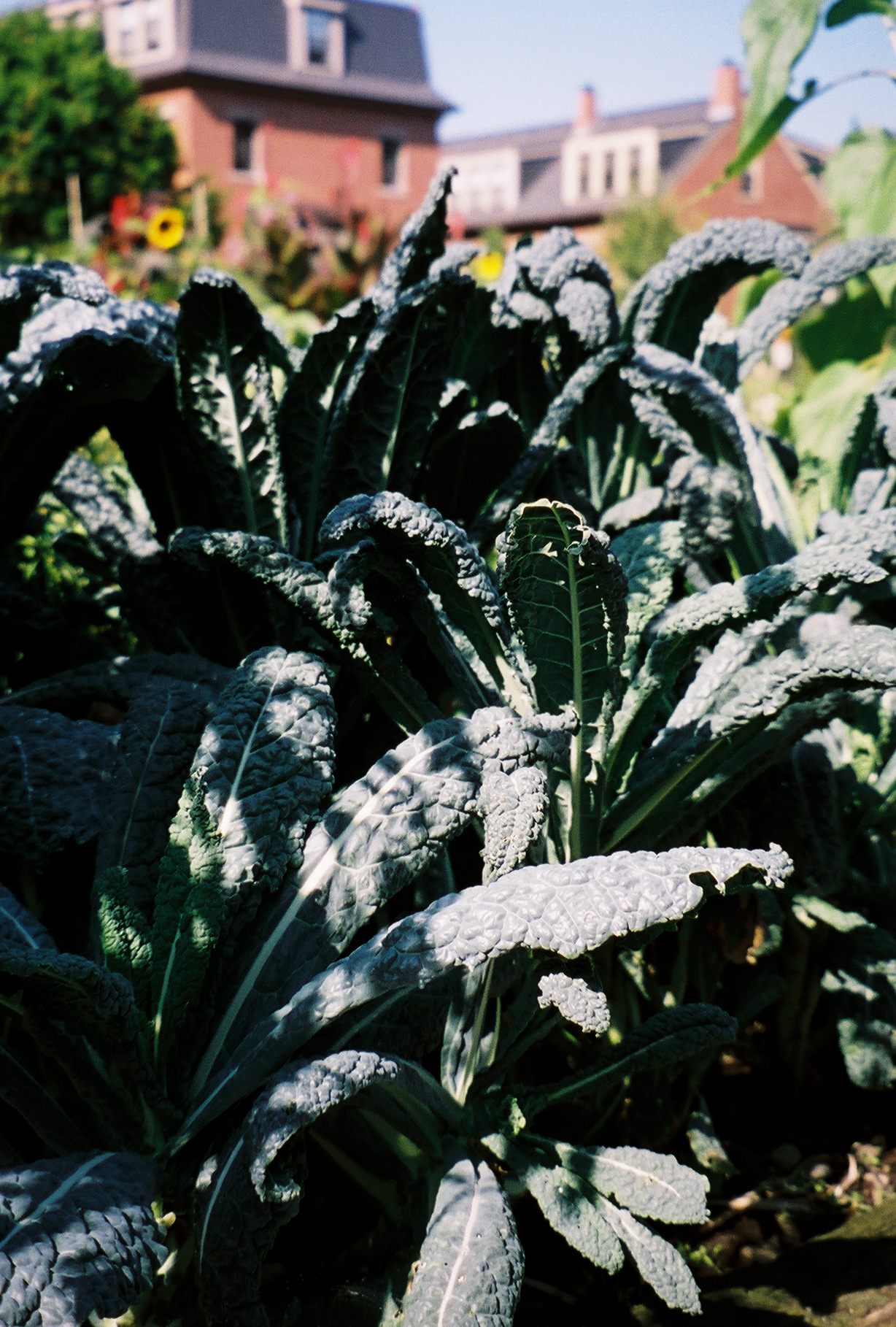
Tuscan kale Cavolo nero grows in a SELROSLT garden.

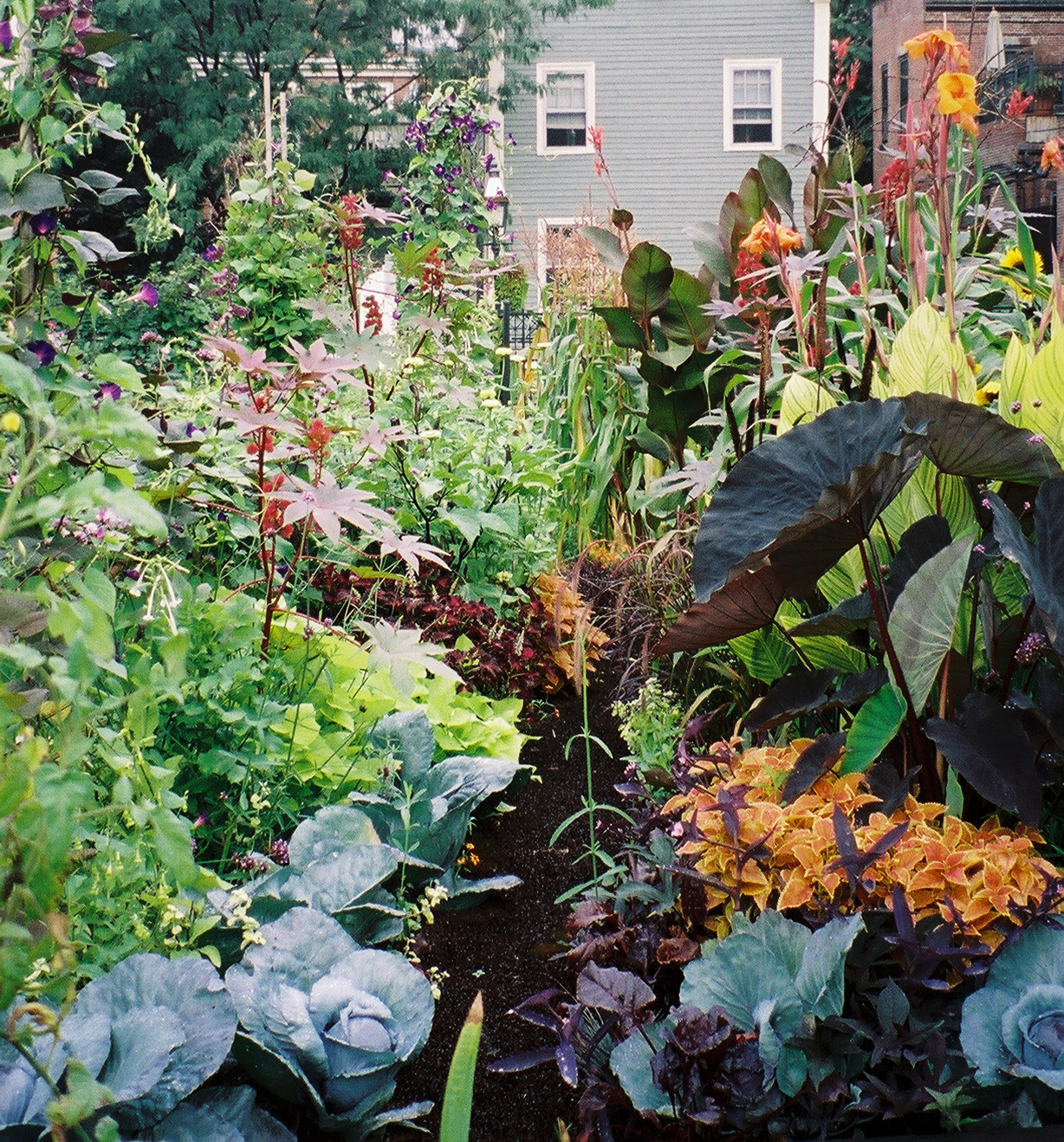
Vegetables and ornamental plants in SELROSLT's Rutland-Washington Garden.

The South End Lower Roxbury Open Space Land Trust (SELROSLT) is a membership-supported, non-profit organization that owns, protects, and manages 16 community gardens and pocket parks in the South End and Lower Roxbury neighborhoods of Boston, in the U.S. state of Massachusetts. It is a member of the American Community Gardening Association, the Boston Natural Areas Network, the Land Trust Alliance, and a partnering grantee of the New England Grassroots Environment Fund.

In July 2012, SELROSLT officially voted to merge with, and was absorbed by Boston Natural Areas Network.

== Mission ==
The South End Lower Roxbury Open Space Land Trust works to acquire, own, improve, and maintain open space for community gardening and pocket parks in the South End and Lower Roxbury neighborhoods of Boston for the public benefit in perpetuity.

== History ==
The Land Trust was established in 1991 with the intent to incorporate and protect eight established community gardens. The existing gardens were owned by a variety of institutions, none of them with long term legal protection. The legal incorporation as a non-profit organization with an elected board composed of neighbors created an entity that was able to partner with The Trust for Public Land to purchase the range of properties from a variety of owners, and set in place a process to use and care for the gardens in perpetuity. Many of the original eight gardens were primarily food producing, helping to augment the budgets of low and moderate-income urban families. Land Trust gardens continue to be places of food production, as well as gardeners growing ornamental plants.

SELROSLT held and operated sixteen community gardens, gardened by approximately 600 gardeners, and accessible to their adjacent neighborhoods. Individual gardens have received awards from the Massachusetts Horticultural Society, the City of Boston, and Horticulture magazine. Three SELROSLT community gardens have been the subject of the nationally distributed WGBH-produced program The Victory Garden.

In July 2012, after a year of joint planning, SELROSLT voted to merge into Boston Natural Areas Network (BNAN). The time had come for SELROSLT to move from an all volunteer organization to an organization that provided full-time staff and greater resources. The merger gives the community gardens access the resources of BNAN, and their affiliate The Trustees of Reservations. The deeds for all SELROSLT community spaces were all transferred to BNAN, ensuring the protection of community gardens and open spaces in perpetuity.

== Membership ==
Membership is open to individuals and families interested in urban gardening. Each community garden maintains a waiting list. Most individual community gardens have a membership committee which manages the waiting list, works with the garden's leadership committee, and helps orient new gardeners to the garden. Waiting periods vary by garden and there are no statistics available on wait time. Members pay an annual plot fee, and an additional Land Trust membership fee. Costs are moderate, and payable on a sliding fee. Members may vote at an annual meeting, participate on committees, and are required to maintain their plot in a clean and productive state.

== Gardening ==
Plot sizes vary from 5 by 9 ft (1.5 by 2.7 m) to 14 by 28 ft (4.3 by 8.5 m). Gardening members come from the immediately adjoining neighborhoods. Individual gardens vary greatly in what is grown and harvested. Located in two diverse urban neighborhoods, a wide variety of food, flowers and plant material is grown based somewhat on ethnicity, ancestry, or if a gardener is a recent immigrant, their home country. Land Trust rules allow individual gardens to grow whatever they choose in their plot as long as it is not grown for commercial sale. Most gardeners grow a mix of vegetables and ornamentals. A few of the gardens operate a composting system to convert discarded plant material to soil and fertilizer. Roughly half of the gardens have perimeter borders termed community borders, which are planted with ornamental plants, flowers and small shrubs.

== Funding and operations ==
The Land Trust operates with funds raised through garden plot fees, fundraising activities including the annual South End Garden Tour, and varied other events. Additional funds from private and public sources, via direct grants, have contributed over $1,000,000. Funds have been used to provide water systems, decontaminate soils, to install consistent iron fencing and granite curbing, and to build gazebo community spaces in the local gardens.

== Governance ==
Each of the community gardens elects or appoints a representative to the SELROSLT board. The board elects a president from membership. The president is a volunteer position, focused on day-to-day operations of the gardens, coordination with the City of Boston and membership. The individual community gardens send plot fees to the Land Trust to pay liability insurance and water service. Individual gardens are intended to be democratically self-governing, and the form of governance varies from garden to garden. Some gardens elect a coordinator, or two coordinators; others elect a leadership committee.

== SELROSLT's 16 gardens and parks ==
- Berkeley Street Community Garden
- Bessie Barnes Memorial Park
- Bessie Barnes Memorial Garden
- Dartmouth Pocket Park
- Frederick Douglas Intergenerational Garden
- Harrison Urban Garden
- Lenox-Kendall Community Garden
- Northampton Community Garden
- Rutland-Washington Community Garden (Gazebo Garden)
- Rutland's Haven Community Garden
- Rutland Green Pocket Park
- Wellington Common Community Garden
- Wellington Green
- Warren-Clarendon Community Garden
- Worcester Street Garden
- West Springfield Community Garden

== See also ==
- Communal garden
- Commons
- Community Supported Agriculture
- South Central Farm
- Intercultural Garden
