= Cape Poge Wildlife Refuge =

Wildlife refuge in Massachusetts, United States

Coordinates: 41°25′07.63″N 70°27′06.43″W

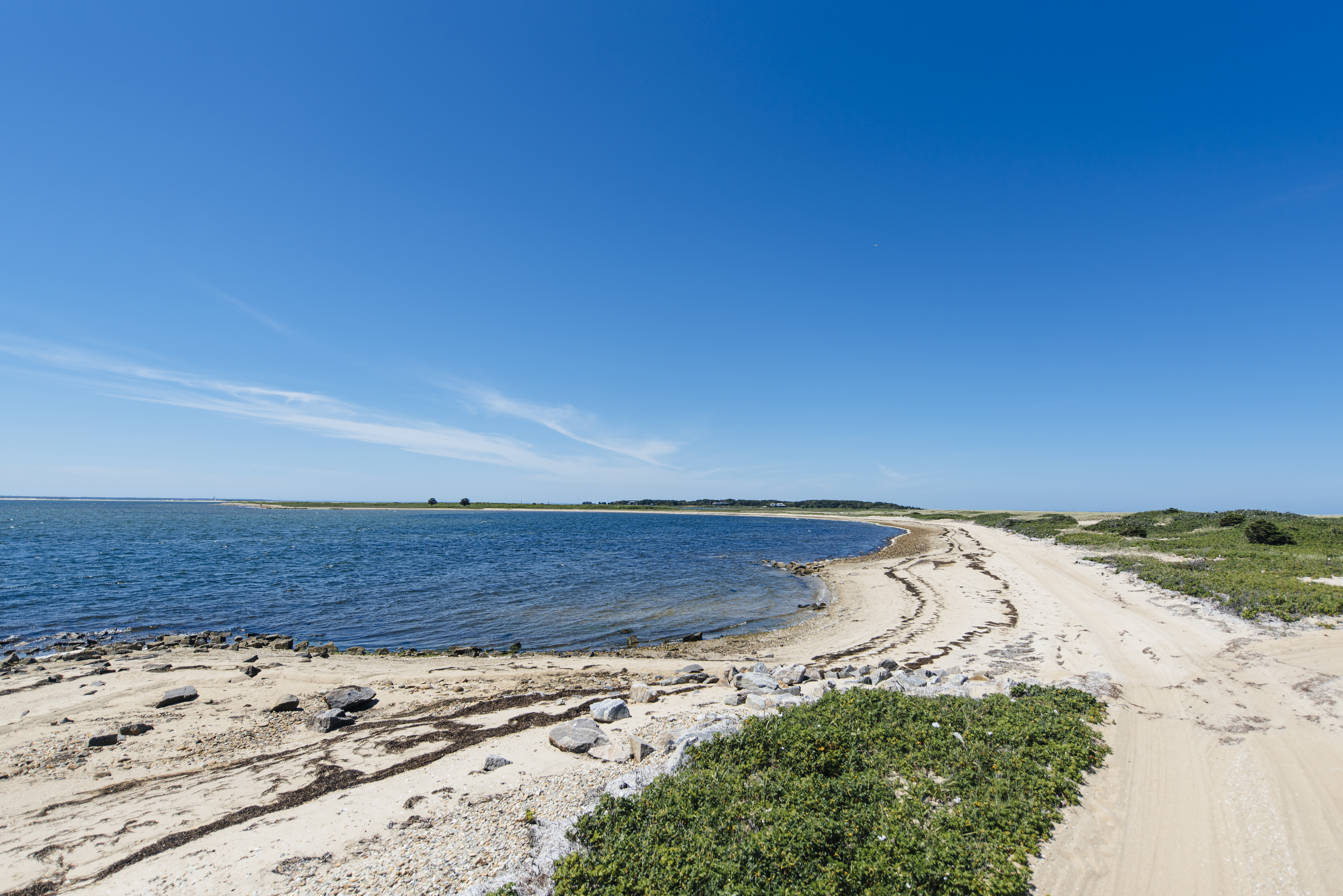
Beach stretching south with Cape Poge Bay to the left

Cape Poge Wildlife Refuge is a wildlife refuge on Chappaquiddick Island (Martha's Vineyard, Massachusetts) owned and managed by The Trustees of Reservations. The refuge consists of 516 acres (2.09 km^{2}) and includes the 1893 Cape Poge Lighthouse.

== Description ==
Cape Poge Lighthouse pictured from the south

Chappaquiddick Island's eastern edge is a barrier beach formed thousands of years ago by offshore currents that deposited tons of sand. Today this beach extends for seven miles (11 km) from Wasque Point past the Cape Poge Lighthouse to the Gut.

Tidal waters support extensive salt marshes, especially around Poucha Pond. The Cedars is a grove of century-old, low-growing eastern red cedars sculpted by salt spray and wind. Cape Poge Elbow is home to a gull rookery and nests of piping plovers, least terns, and American oystercatchers. West of the dunes lies Cape Poge Bay, where calm, clear waters serve as a nursery for finfish and shellfish. Powerful currents push through the Gut, flushing Cape Poge Bay with oxygen-rich water and attracting striped bass, bluefish, bonito, and albacore.

Seasonal tours allow visitors to explore the lighthouse, diverse upland and marine habitats, and world-renowned fishing spots. Annual over-sand vehicle permits are available for qualified vehicles, providing access to 14 miles (23 km) of dune roads. The lighthouse can also be reached via a 3.5-mile (5.6 km) hike from the Dike Bridge. Canoe and kayak rentals are available.

== Property History ==
The Cape Poge Wildlife Refuge was acquired by The Trustees of Reservations in 1959. Additional land was donated to or purchased by the Trustees in 1965, 1970, 1971, 1972, 1975, 1976, 1977, 1978, 1984 and 1995.
