= Mytoi =

Japanese garden in Martha's Vineyard, Massachusetts

Coordinates: 41°22′33″N 70°27′31″W

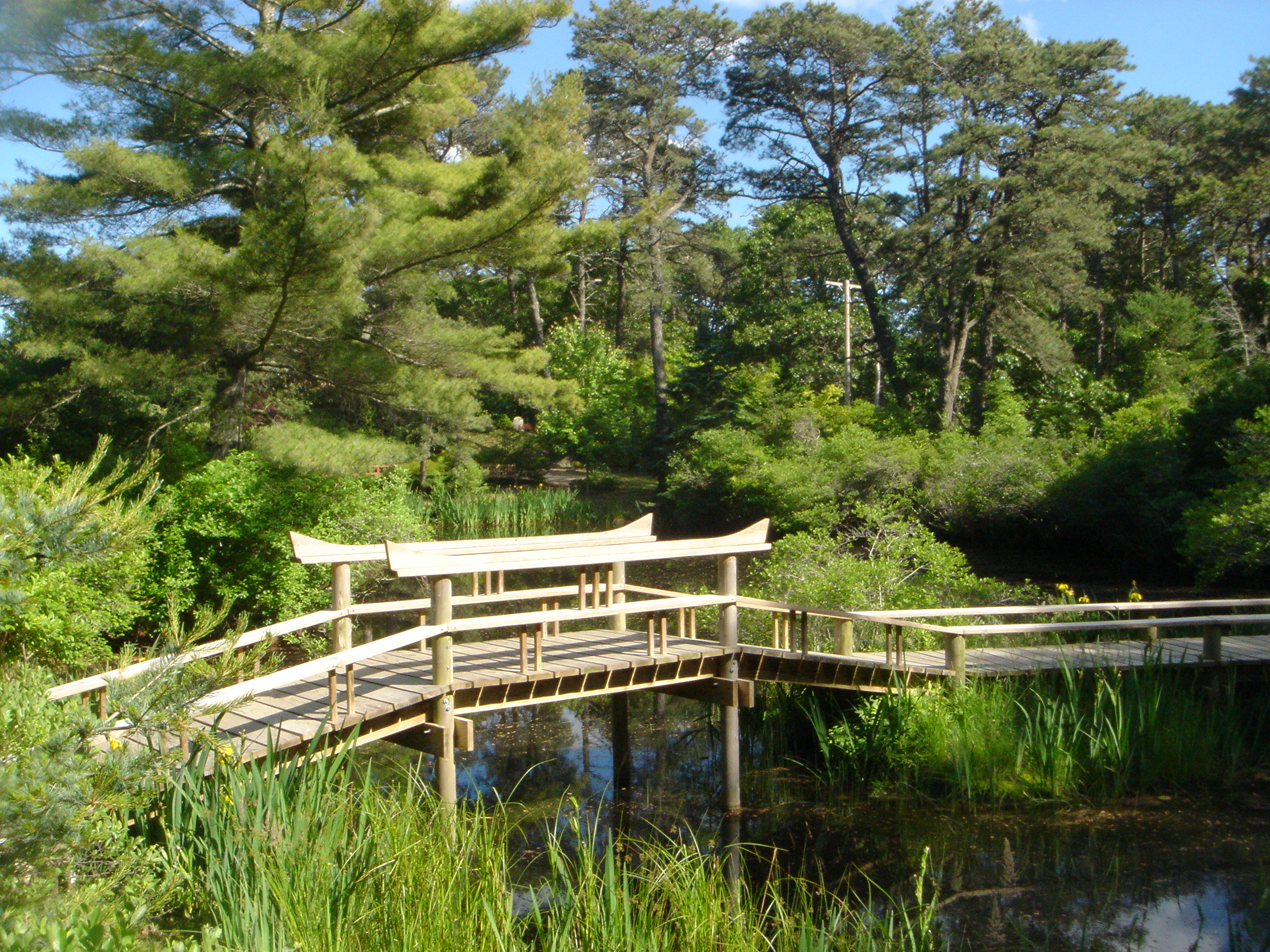
Mytoi Garden

Mytoi (pronounced mee-toy) is a small Japanese garden in an open pine forest on Chappaquiddick Island, in Martha's Vineyard, Massachusetts. The Trustees of Reservations owns and maintains the property.

The garden has a small pond with an island that is reached by an arched footbridge.

The Trustees of Reservations acquired the property in 1976 as a gift from Mary Wakeman and extended it in 1981.
