= Chappaquiddick Island =

Small island at the eastern end of Martha's Vineyard, MA, US

Native name: Noepetchepi-aquidenet Nickname: Chappy
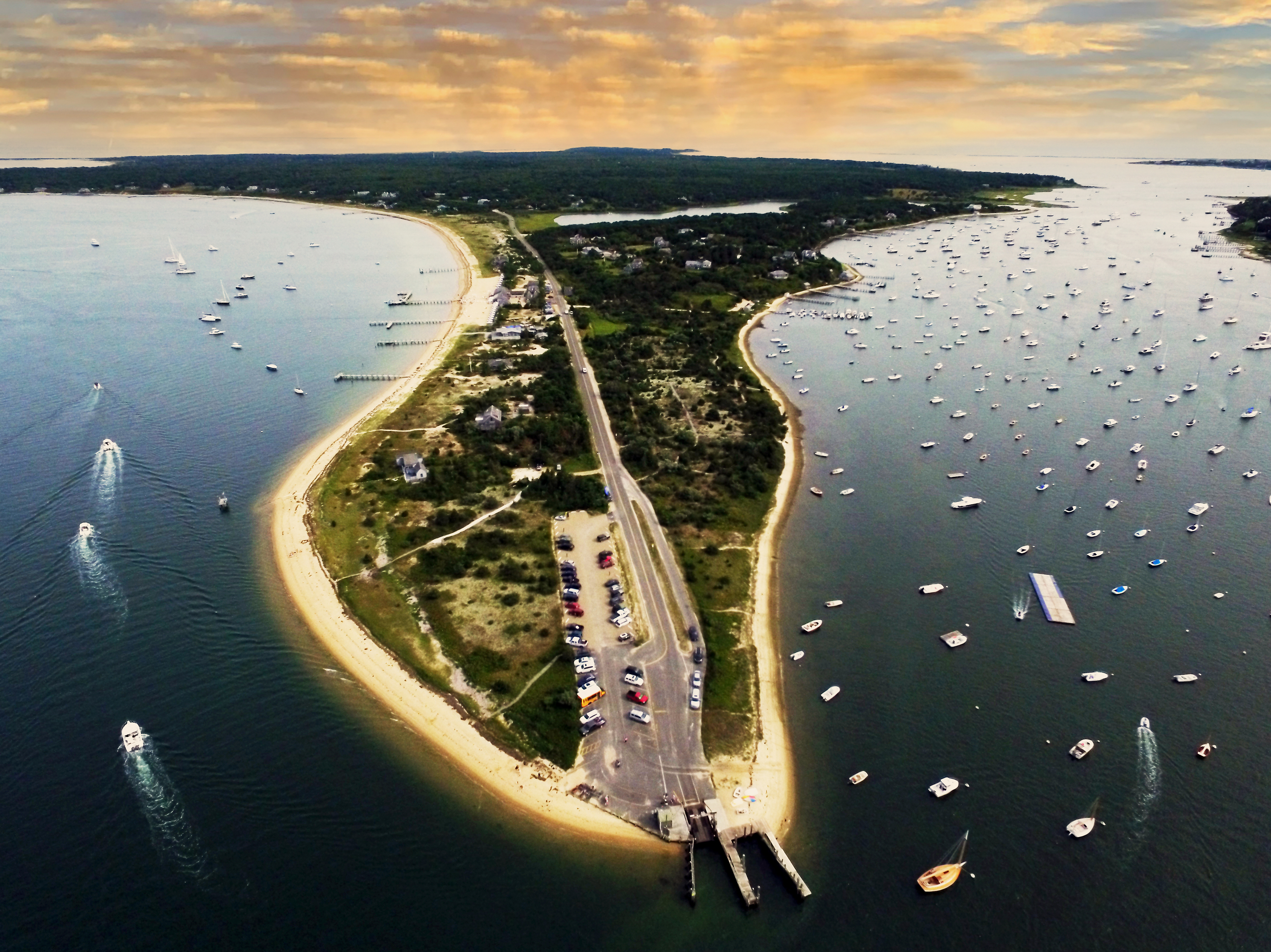

- Location within Massachusetts Location within the United States

Geography
- Location: Peninsula and occasional island east of Martha’s Vineyard
- Coordinates: 41°22′34″N 70°28′33″W
- Area: 15.915 km^{2} (6.145 sq mi)
- Length: 7.96 km (4.95 mi)
- Width: 5.26 km (3.27 mi)
- Highest elevation: 92 ft (28 m)
- Highest point: Sampson Hill

Administration
- United States
- State: Massachusetts
- County: Dukes
- Town: Edgartown

Demographics
- Population: 253

Additional information
- ZIP Code: 02539
- Area code: 508/774

Chappaquiddick Island (/ˌtʃæpəˈkwɪdɪk/ CHAP-uh-KWID-ik; Massachusett language: Noepetchepi-aquidenet; colloquially known as "Chappy”) is an island and occasional peninsula off the eastern end of Martha's Vineyard. Norton Point, a narrow barrier beach, connects Martha's Vineyard and Chappaquiddick between Katama and Wasque (/ˈweɪskwiː/). Breaches occur due to hurricanes and strong storms separating the islands for periods of time. The two islands were connected as recently as January 1, 2026. While both land forms have mostly been connected to one another in modern history, Chappaquiddick is nevertheless referred to as an island.

Visitors come to the isolated island for beaches, cycling, hiking, nature tours and birding, and the Mytoi Gardens, a small Japanese garden created amidst the native brush. Two fire trucks are stationed on the island from Edgartown. Chappaquiddick Road and Poucha Road, both paved, provide access to sandy, woodland roads, trails, and shorelines.

Chappaquiddick became internationally known following an incident of the same name in 1969, when U.S. Senator Ted Kennedy accidentally drove his car off the island's Dike Bridge into Poucha Pond. Kennedy's 28-year-old passenger, Mary Jo Kopechne, suffocated inside the car.

== Name and early settlement ==
The name Chappaquiddick comes from a Native American word "cheppiaquidne" meaning "separated island", so named because this island is separated from Martha's Vineyard by a narrow strait or gut. The island has been historically spelled "Chaubaqueduck" or, alternatively, "Chappaquidgick".

The island was once mainly the home territory of the Chappaquiddick band of the Wampanoag people, and remained exclusively theirs well into the nineteenth century. They still have a reservation of about 100 acres (40 ha) (40 hectares) of brush land in the interior.

Early colonists settled Edgartown in 1642, and quickly proclaimed Chappaquiddick as village property. The first homes owned by people of exclusively European descent were built around 1750; these residents raised livestock and farmed the land.

== Geography ==
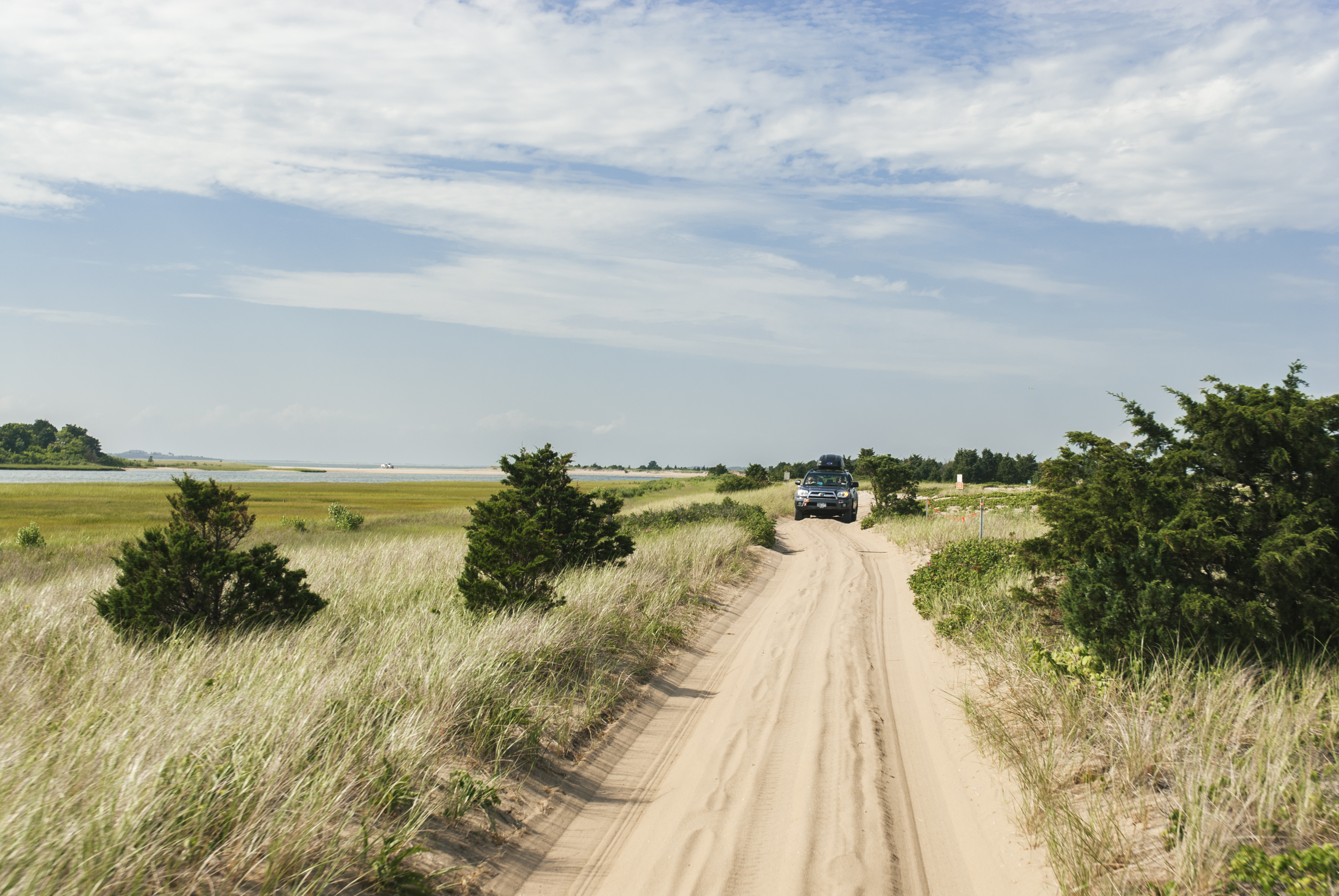
Toms Neck Road on Chappaquiddick Island

The United States Census Bureau defines it as Block Group 1, Census Tract 2003 of Dukes County, Massachusetts. It has 15.915 km^{2} (6.145 sq mi) of land. Administratively, it is part of the town of Edgartown and Dukes County.

The Trustees of Reservations, a non-profit conservation organization, owns and manages nearly 1,000 acres (405 ha) of land from the southeastern point, Wasque, to Cape Poge, at the northeast. Wasque is a popular fishing spot for catching bluefish, striped bass, and other species. The Cape Poge Lighthouse, first erected in 1801, has served ships navigating the shoals and shallows of Muskeget Channel.

Chappaquiddick is mainly defined by its diverse land and water ecologies with expansive salt marshes, ponds, red cedar woods, grassy meadows, and coastal wildlife including sandpipers, piping plovers, blue heron, osprey, and oysters. The main interior bodies of water include Cape Poge Bay, Katama Bay, and Poucha Pond, all salty.

While the island has continually faced shifting coastlines due to ocean currents, storm surges, and astronomical tides, the 21st century has presented new erosion challenges, particularly to Wasque Point which, during the Patriots' Day Storm of 2007, was battered severely. Between 2007 and 2013, approximately 40 acres (16 ha) of land were lost at Wasque, where currents eroded bluffs, swallowed Swan Pond, damaged shoreline trails, and threatened a residence.

=== Breaches between Katama and Wasque ===
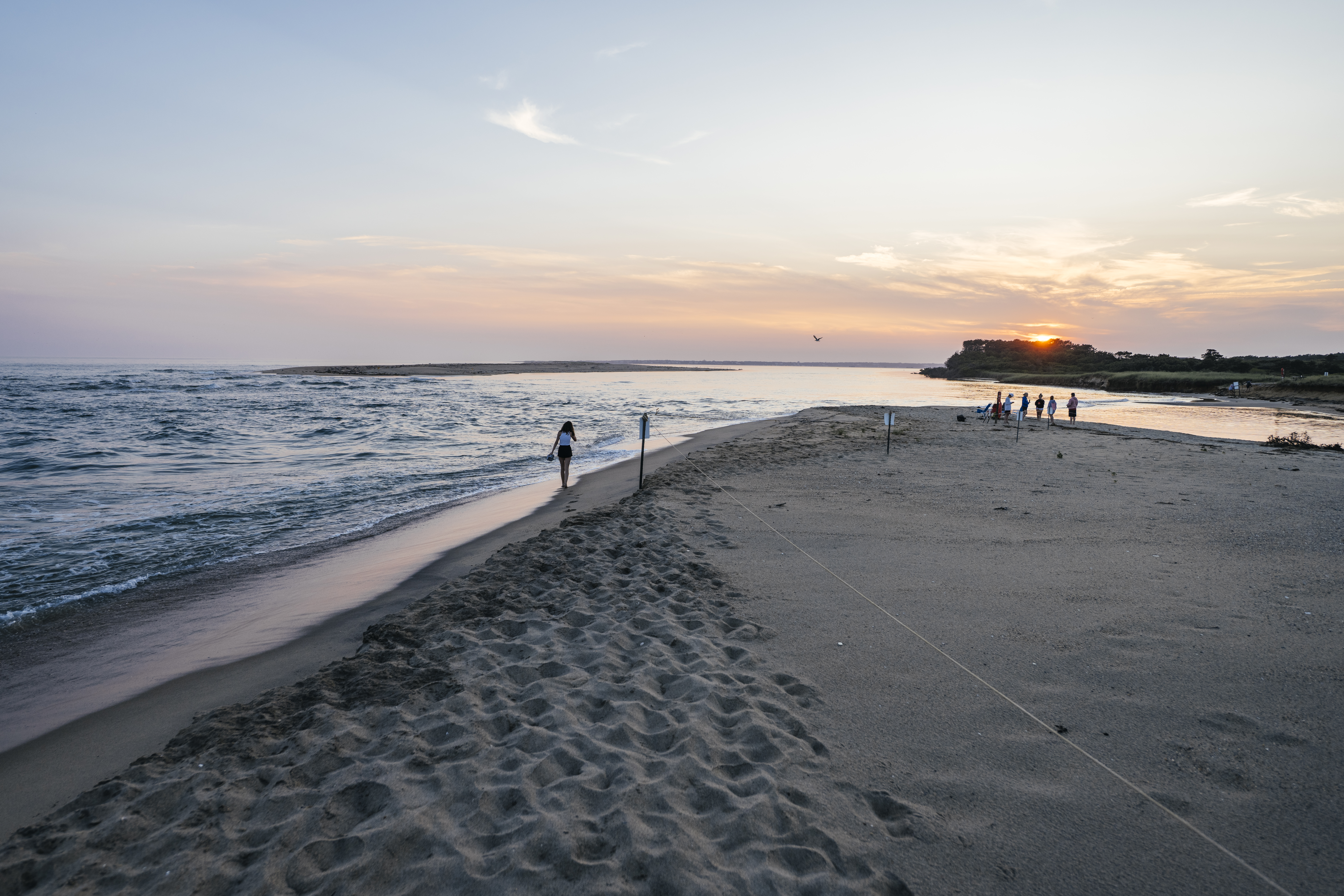
The area between Norton Point, Edgartown (in the distance) and Wepua Point, Chappaquiddick (foreground). This was the 2022 to 2023 breach, opening up Katama Bay to the Atlantic Ocean to the south (left).

| Date Range | | Status | Length of Time | Event |
|---|---|---|---|---|
| Before 1750 | 1800 | Island | more than 140 years | |
| 1800 | 1800 | Peninsula | less than 1 year | |
| 1800 | 1869 | Island | 69 years | |
| 1869 | 1886 | Peninsula | 17 years | |
| 1886 | 1903 | Island | 17 years | |
| 1903 | 1921 | Peninsula | 18 years | |
| 1921 | September 1938 | Man-Made Breaches | 17 years | |
| September 1938 | 1951 | Island | 13 years | 1938 New England hurricane |
| 1951 | 1953 | Peninsula | 2 years | |
| 1953 | 1969 | Island | 17 years | |
| 1969 | 1976 | Peninsula | 7 years | |
| 1976 | 1977 | Island | 1 year | |
| 1977 | April 17, 2007 | Peninsula | 30 years | |
| April 17, 2007 | April 2, 2015 | Island | 7 years, 11 months, 16 days | April 2007 nor'easter |
| April 2, 2015 | December 27, 2022 | Peninsula | 7 years, 8 months, 25 days | |
| December 27, 2022 | December 31, 2023 | Island | 1 year, 4 days | High winds and tide on December 22, 2022 |
| December 31, 2023 | January 1, 2026 | Peninsula | 2 years, 1 day | In 2025, some wash-over due to Hurricane Erin (2025) |
| January 1, 2026 | Present | Island | | New Year’s Day squall |

== Population ==
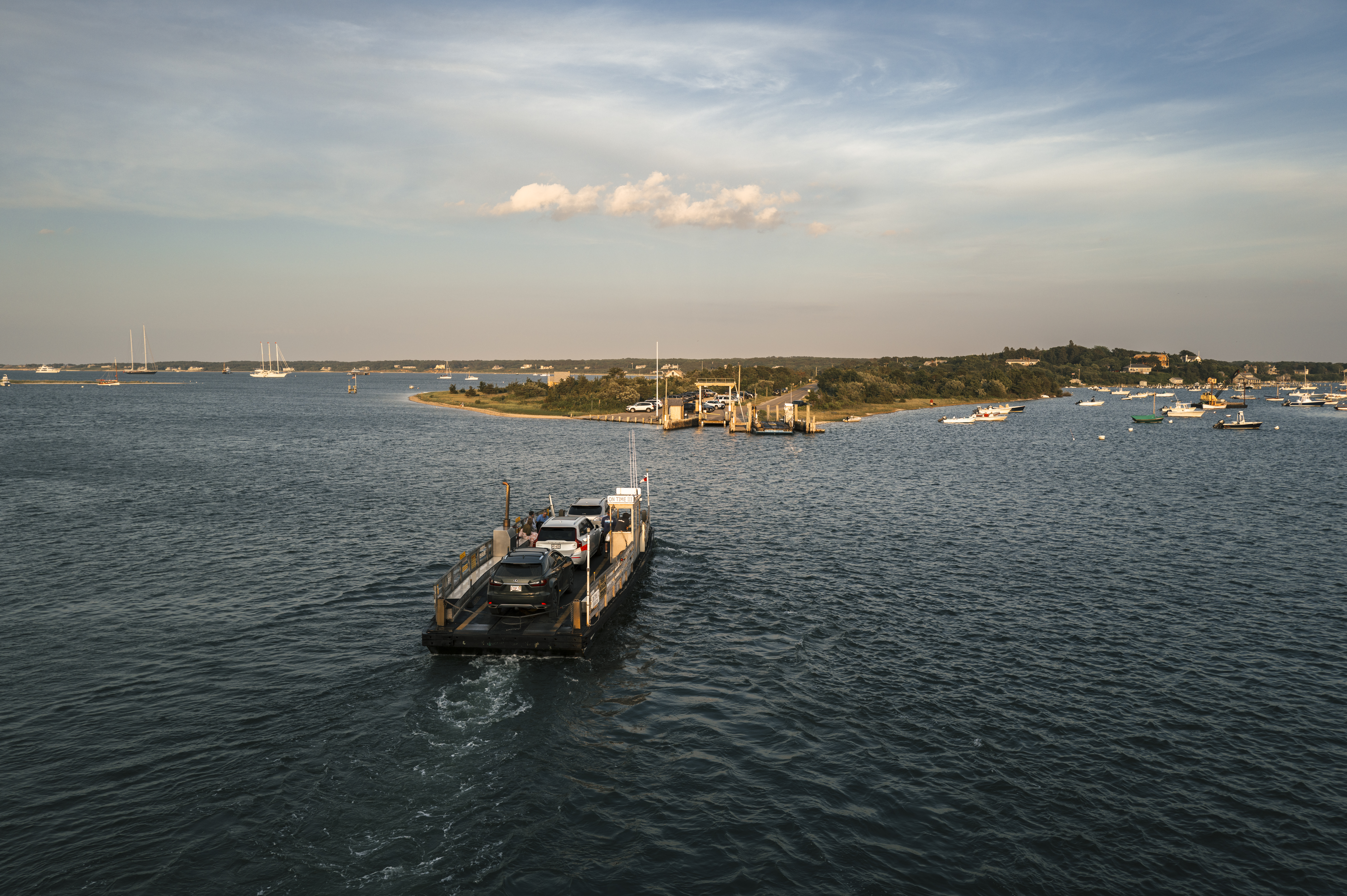
The On Time III shuttling passengers between mainland Martha's Vineyard and Chappaquiddick

The 2020 census reported 253 residents on Chappaquiddick, up from 179 in 2010. The racial makeup was 92% White, 1% Native American, 1% Asian, and 4% from two or more races. Hispanic or Latino of any race were 1% of the population.

Socially, its residents form a tight-knit community and see themselves as distinctly separate from the rest of Edgartown. Longtime residents speak of "going to the mainland" when they travel to Edgartown and of "going to America" when (for example) they travel to Boston or Cape Cod.

Access to the island is served by privately owned barge-like ferries named the On Time II and On Time III which shuttle pedestrians, bicycles, and up to three cars at a time between Chappaquiddick and Edgartown, on Martha's Vineyard. Two ferries run during the summer months and one during the off-season. Overland access is possible with four-wheel drive vehicles and on foot on the south shore when the islands are connected and conditions permit.

== Ted Kennedy incident ==
Dike Bridge, Chappaquiddick

Chappaquiddick Island gained international attention on July 19, 1969, when the body of Mary Jo Kopechne was discovered inside an overturned Oldsmobile 88 off Dike Bridge in Poucha Pond. The car belonged to U.S. Senator Ted Kennedy, who claimed that he had taken a wrong turn and accidentally driven it off a bridge late the previous night. He did not report the accident to the police for ten hours. A January 1970 judicial inquest into Kopechne's death found that Kennedy's turn toward the bridge was intentional, and he operated his car in a manner "at least negligent and possibly reckless". A grand jury investigation was held in April 1970; no indictments were issued. Dike Bridge was closed until 1995. In 2017, a film based on the incident was released, with many scenes filmed on Chappaquiddick itself and in Edgartown.

== See also ==
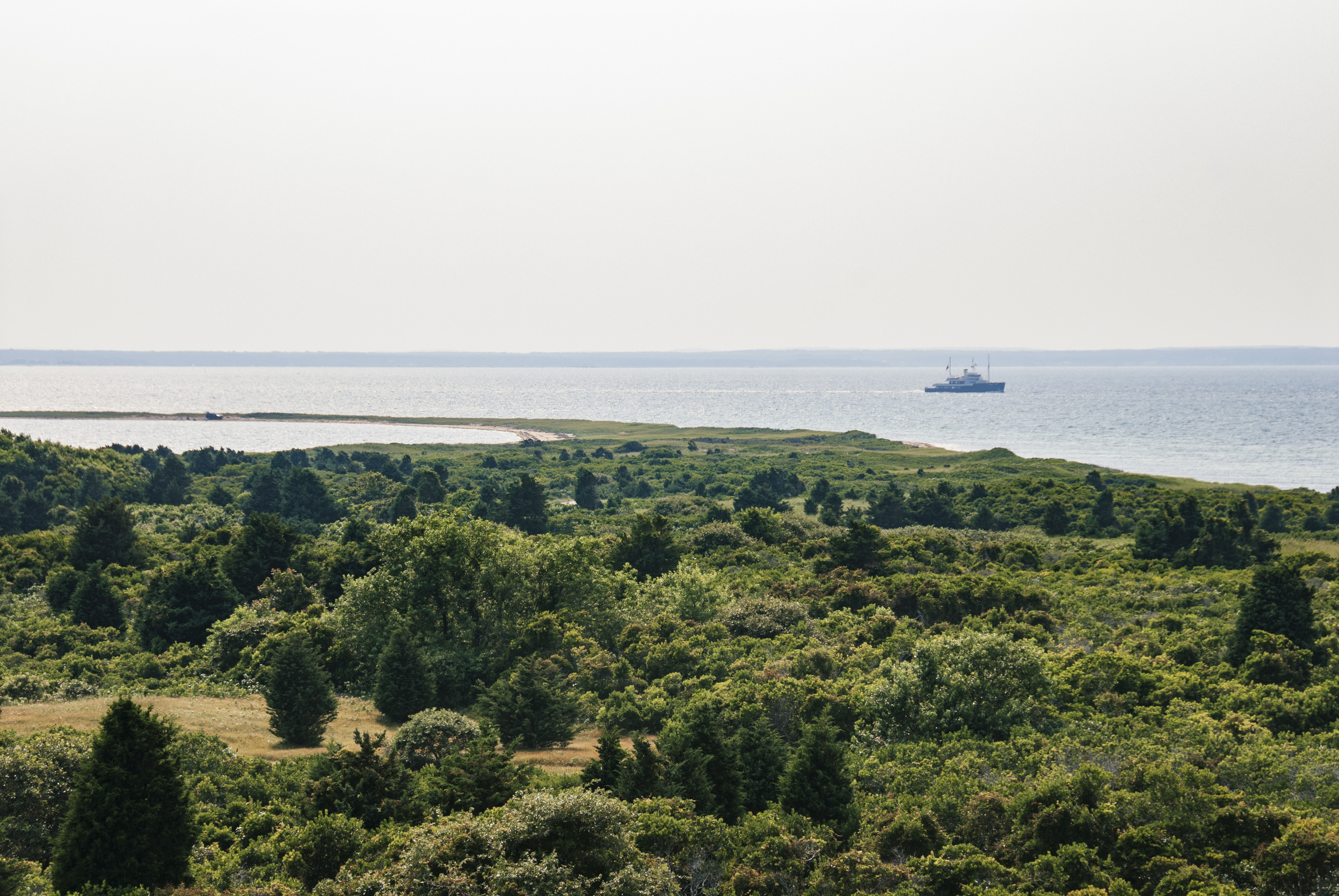
Looking west from Cape Poge Lighthouse

- Cape Poge Light
- Edgartown Yacht Club
