= Appleton Farms =

Park in Ipswich, Massachusetts, US

Coordinates: 42.6565°N 70.8450°W

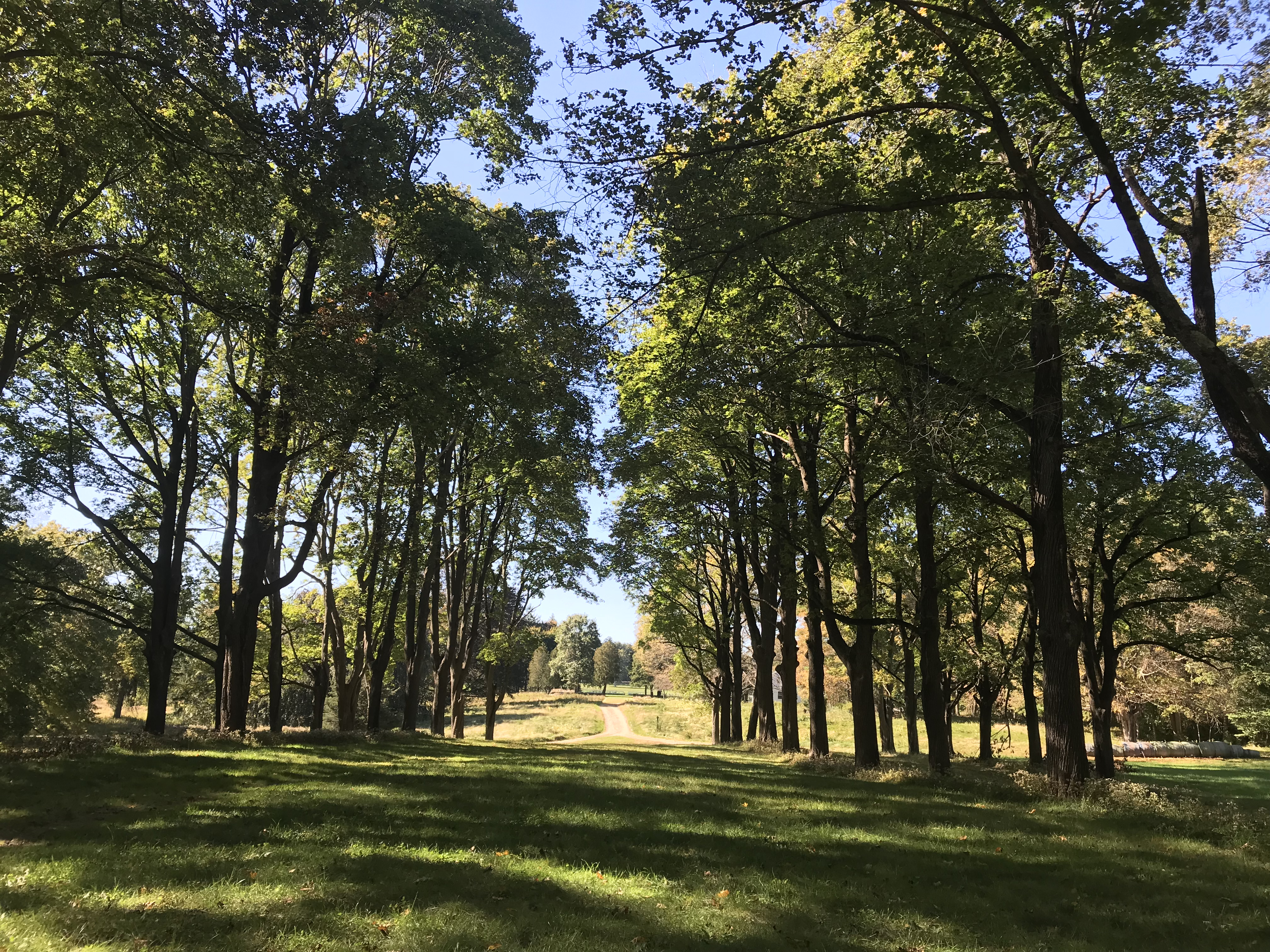
Appleton Farms

Appleton Farms is a park in Ipswich, Massachusetts, owned and maintained by The Trustees of Reservations. The property was deeded to the Trustees in 1998. The land was granted to Samuel Appleton, an immigrant from Little Waldingfield, England, in 1638 by the town of Ipswich and is one of the oldest continuously operating farms in Massachusetts. In 2002, The Trustees of Reservations established a vegetable Community Supported Agriculture Program. Also maintained by the Trustees of Reservations is the adjacent Appleton Farms Grass Rides. The properties include 4 miles (6.4 km) of walking trails.
