= Copicut Woods =

Nature reserve in Fall River, Massachusetts

Coordinates: 41°42′18″N 71°3′16″W

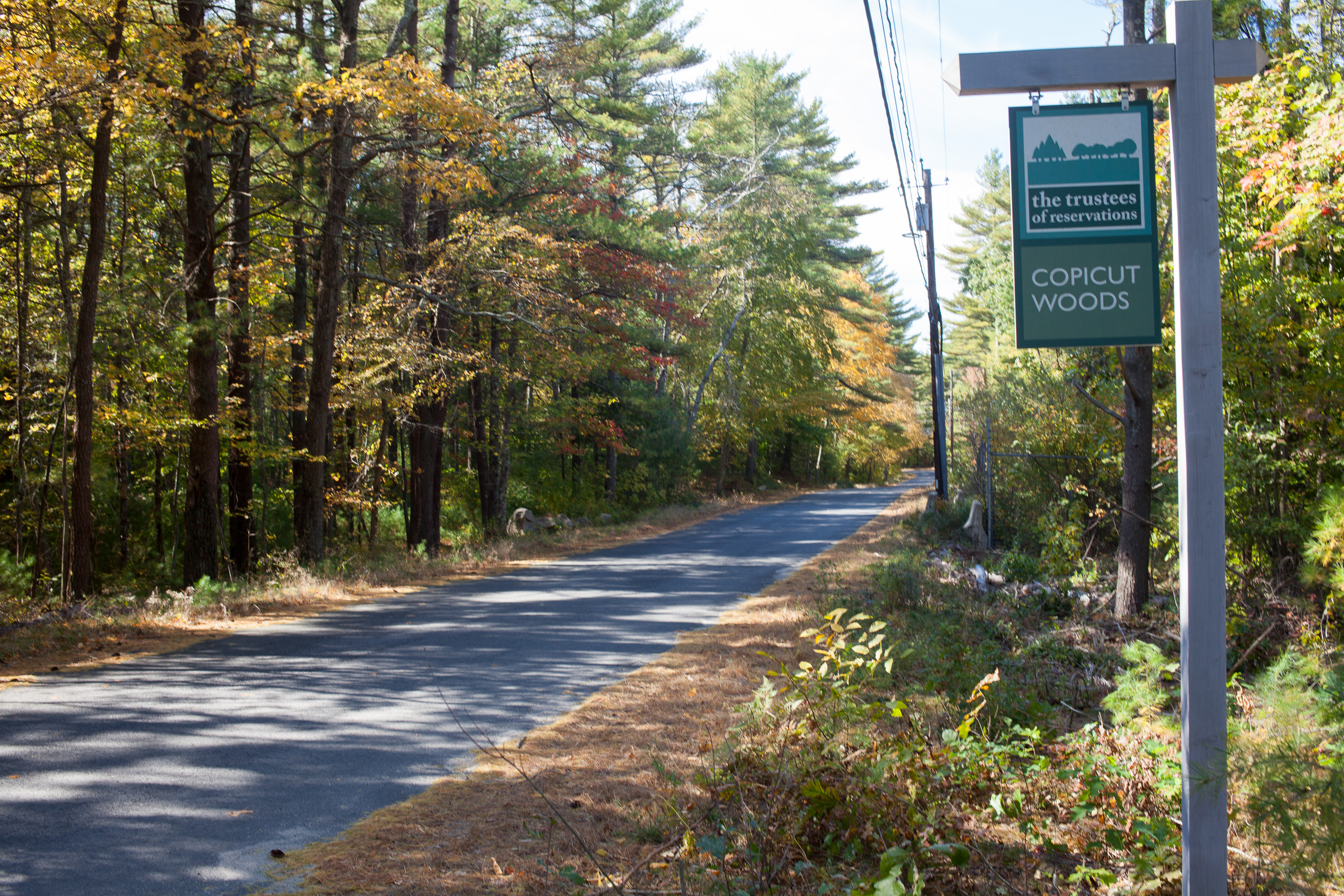
Sign at Copicut Woods.

Copicut Woods is a nature reserve and forest located in Fall River, Massachusetts. The property was acquired by The Trustees of Reservations in 2002. It is a component of the 13,600 acre Southeastern Massachusetts Bioreserve.
