= Long Hill (Beverly, Massachusetts) =

Estate in Beverly, Massachusetts

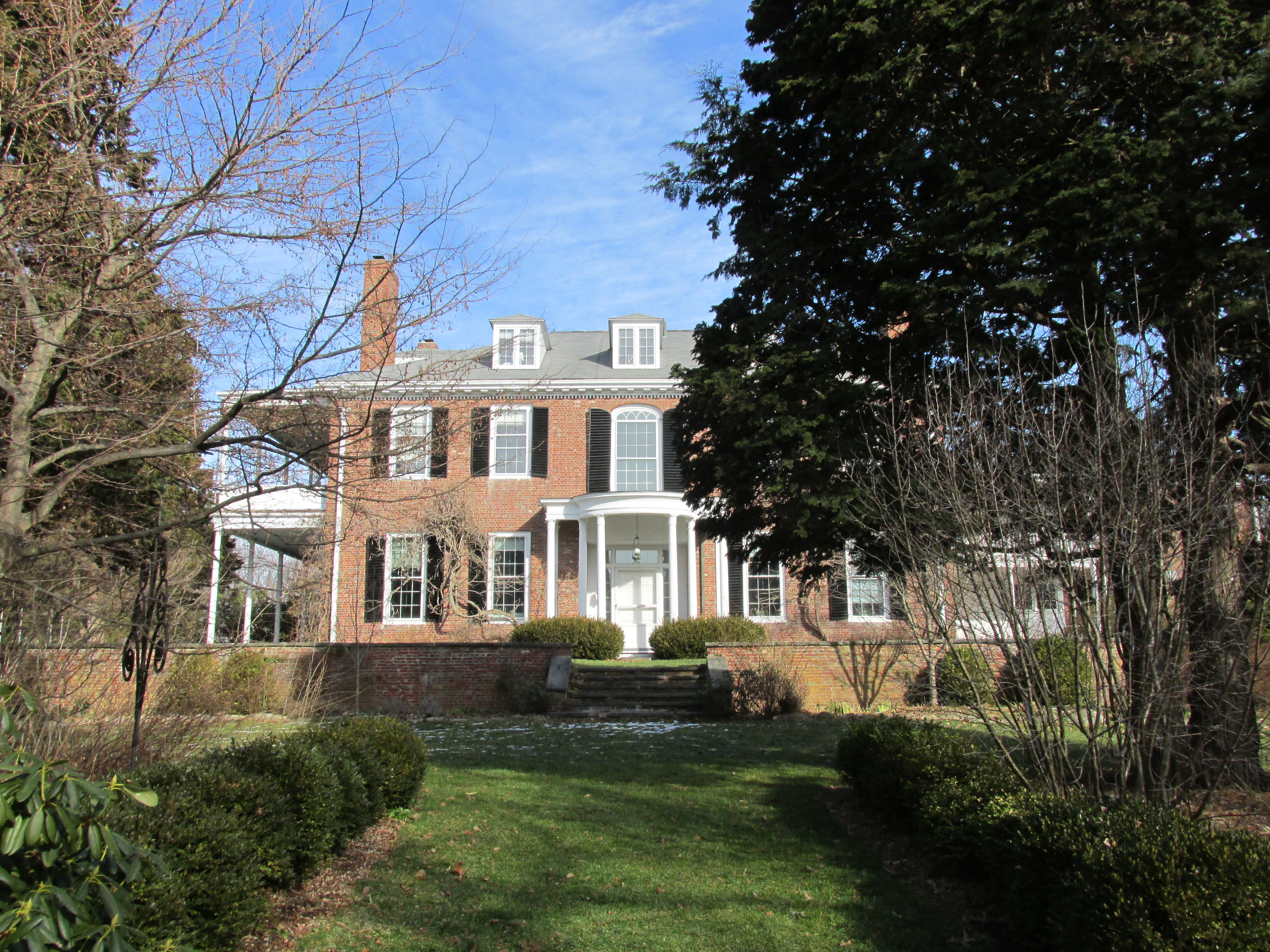
- Interactive map of Long Hill
- Coordinates: 42.5852°N 70.8437°W
- Established: 1979
- Operator: The Trustees of Reservations
- Website: Long Hill

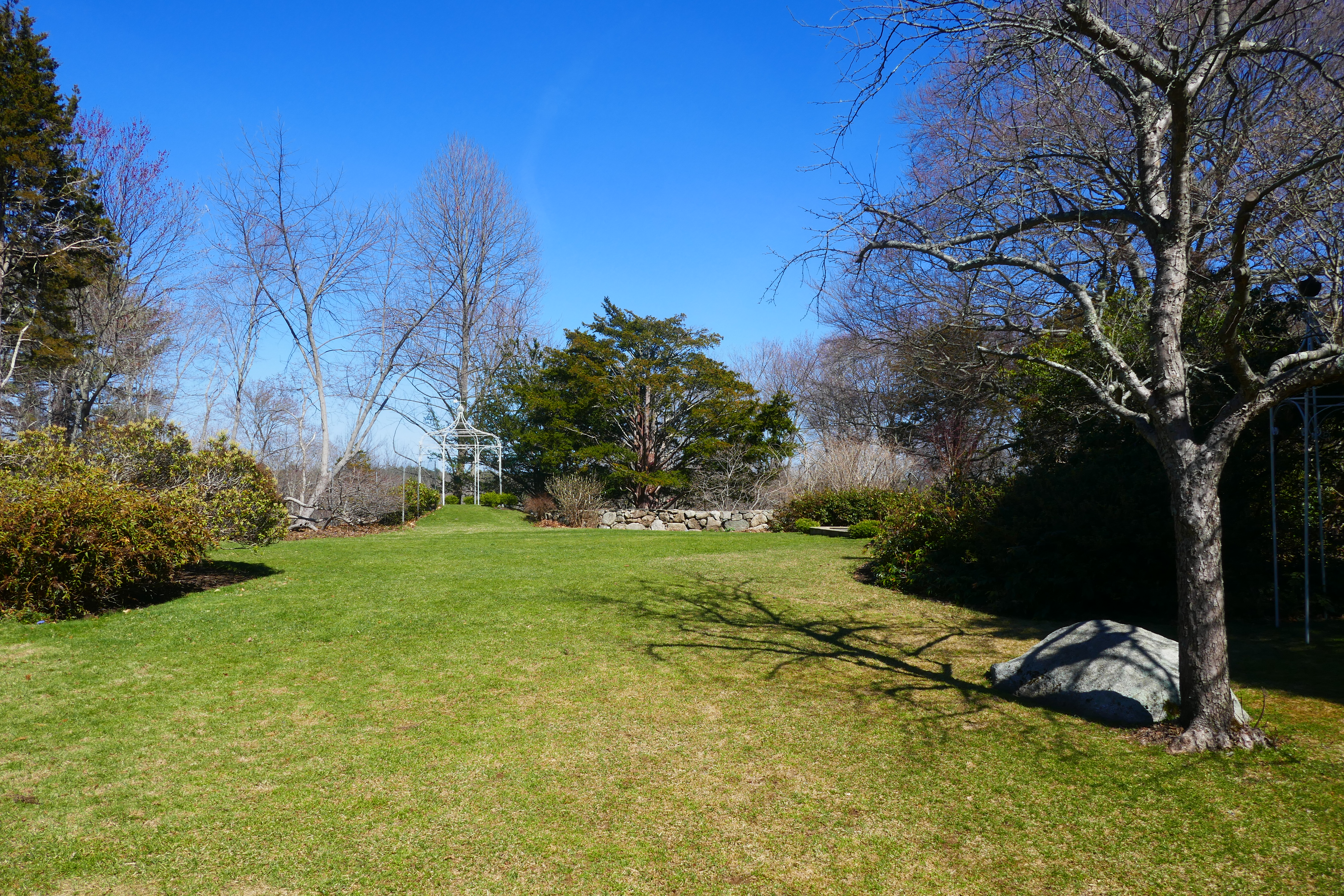
Garden

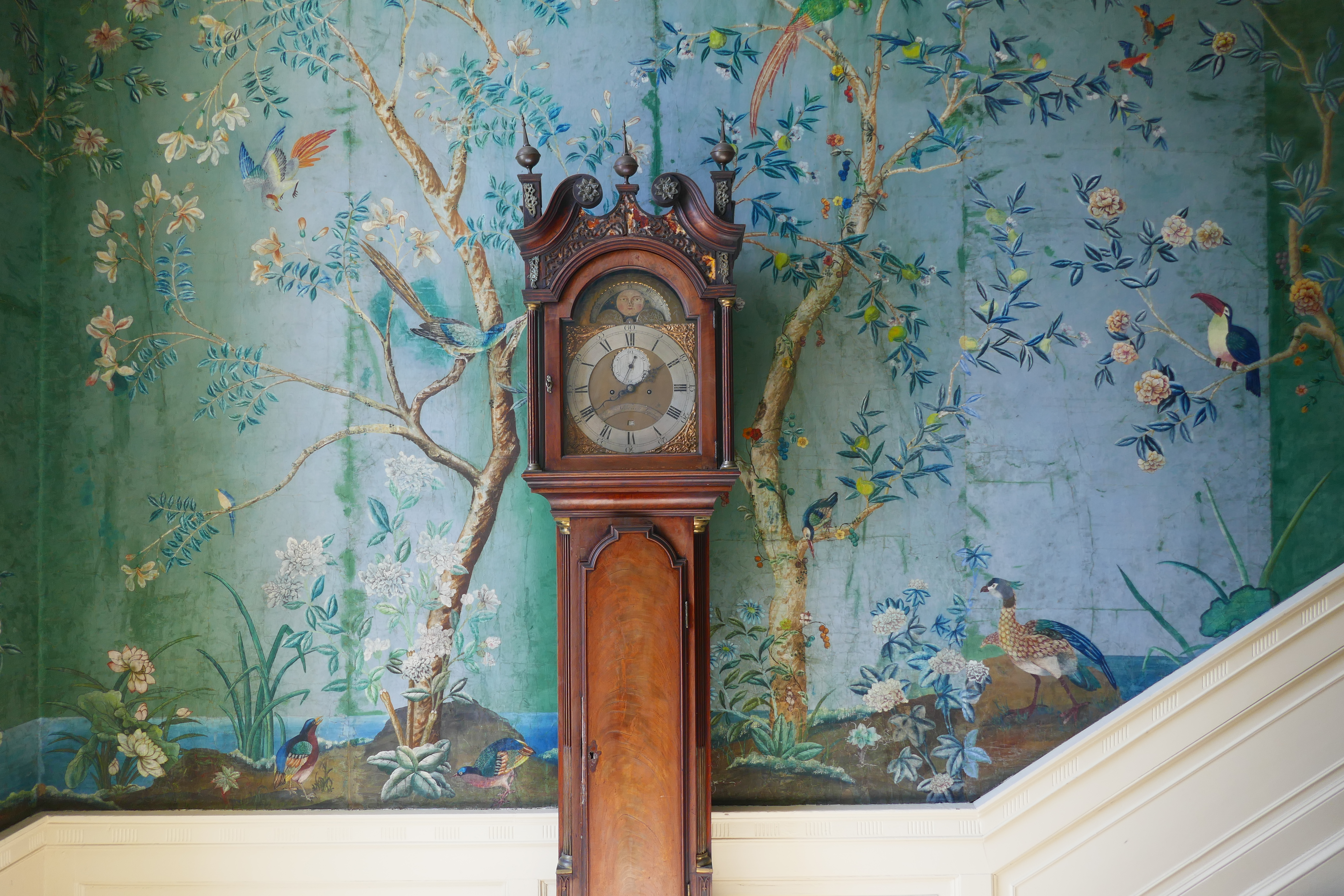
Interior

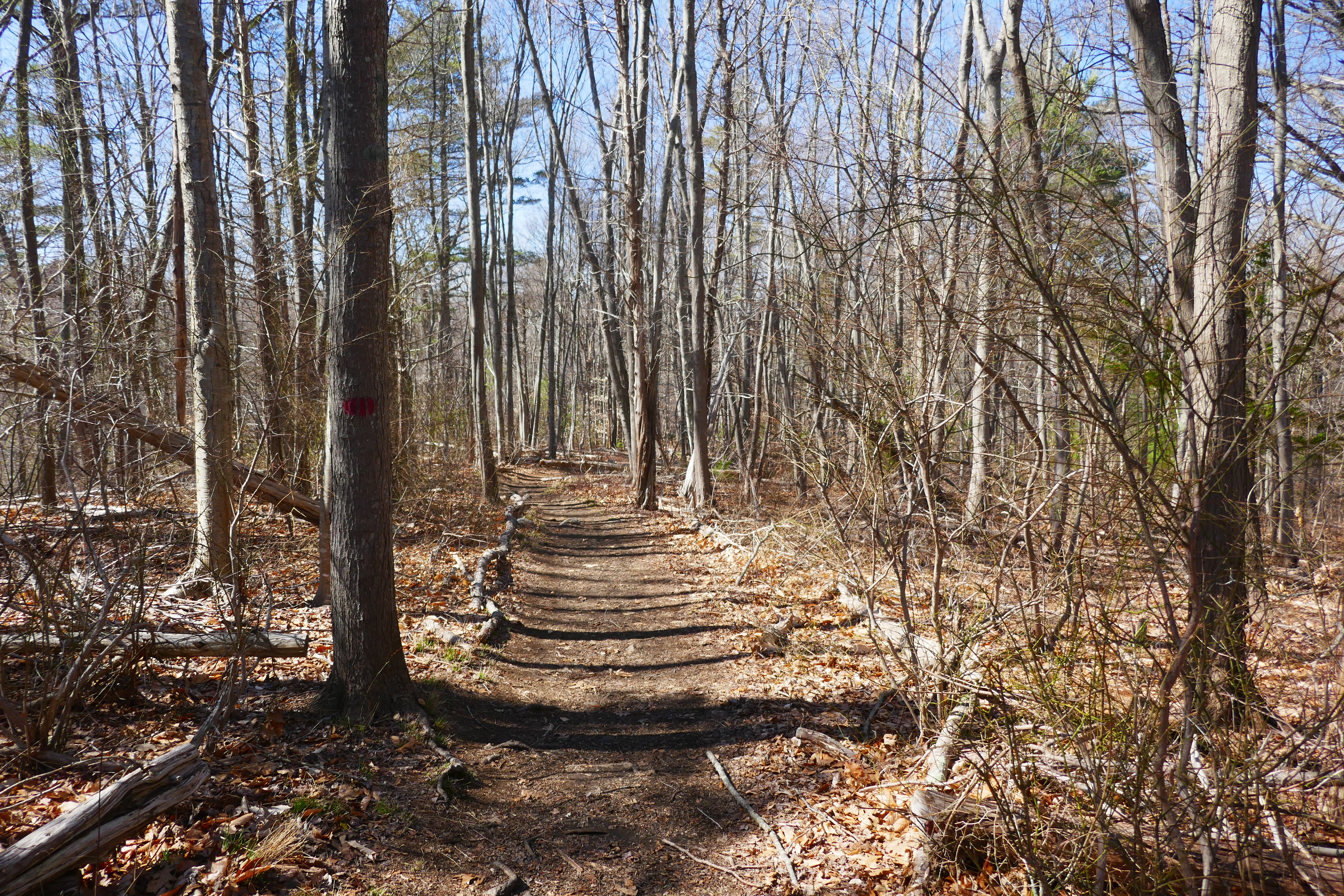
Walking trail

Long Hill is a 114-acre (0.46 km^{2}) estate in Beverly, Massachusetts and is managed by the Trustees of Reservations. From 1916 to 1979, the estate was the summer home of Ellery Sedgwick, author and editor of The Atlantic Monthly. The estate contains a Federal style home with formal gardens, 2 miles (3.2 km) of hiking trails, woodlands, meadows and an apple orchard. The 5 acres (2.0 ha) of cultivated gardens and 100 acres (40 ha) of woodland grounds are open to the public daily.

Until 2017, the Long Hill mansion was used as the main office of The Trustees. In that year, a new headquarters was established in Boston. In 2021, a $6 million project to renovate the house and restore the gardens was started.
