= Cape Poge Light =

Lighthouse on Chappaquiddick Island, Massachusetts, US

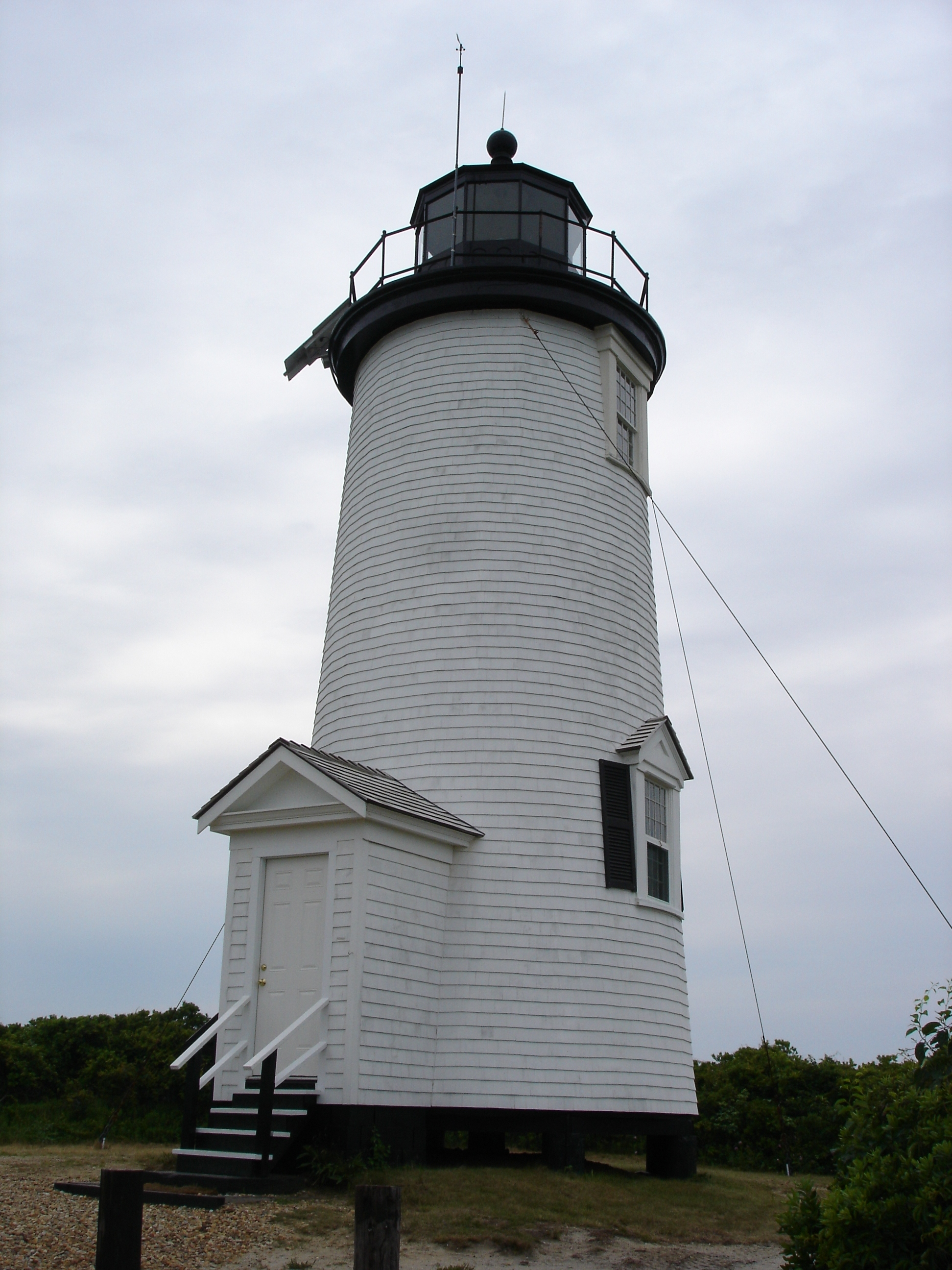
- Location: Chappaquiddick Island, Edgartown, Massachusetts
- Coordinates: 41°25′9.992″N 70°27′8.348″W

Tower
- Constructed: 1801
- Foundation: Stone
- Construction: Wood shingle
- Automated: 1943
- Height: 11 m (36 ft)
- Shape: Conical
- Markings: White with black lantern
- Heritage: National Register of Historic Places listed place
- Fog signal: none

Light
- First lit: 1893 (current tower)
- Focal height: 65 feet (20 m)
- Lens: Fourth order Fresnel lens (original), 12 inches (300 mm) (current)
- Range: 9 nautical miles (17 km; 10 mi)
- Characteristic: Flashing white 6s
- Cape Poge Light
- U.S. National Register of Historic Places
- Area: less than one acre
- Built: 1893
- MPS: Lighthouses of Massachusetts TR
- NRHP reference No.: 87002040
- Added to NRHP: September 28, 1987

Cape Poge Light, sometimes called Cape Pogue Light, is at the northeast tip of Chappaquiddick Island that is part of Martha's Vineyard, off the coast of Cape Cod, Massachusetts.

At least four towers have been built on Cape Poge, with many moves. In 1801 the first 35-foot (11 m) wooden Cape Poge Lighthouse was built for $2,000. During the War of 1812 the light was extinguished for a few months and its apparatus was hidden in the cellar of a Chappaquiddick house. This first lighthouse was moved in 1825 and again in 1838 due to an eroding bluff.

In 1844 a new tower was built for $1,600 and in 1857 supplied with a fourth order Fresnel lens. However, in 1878 it was reported that the keeper's house would probably "fall into the sea within two years." A third lighthouse was therefore built in 1880.

Finally, in 1893 the current, 35-foot (11 m), white conical wood tower was constructed, 40 feet (12 m) inland from the previous one. The current tower has been moved four times, in 1907, 1922, 1960, and in 1987 when it became the first lighthouse to be moved by helicopter). The light was automated in 1943. It was added to the National Register of Historic Places in 1987.

The current light is a 12-inch (300 mm) solar powered beacon that flashes white every 6 seconds and is visible for 9 nautical miles (17 km; 10 mi). The light's focal plane is 65 feet (20 m) above mean high water. The light is currently active and is under the auspices of the United States Coast Guard, however the tower has been transferred and is now owned and operated by The Trustees of Reservations, who provide tours during the summer season. The lighthouse can be reached via a 3.5-mile (5.6 km) hike from the Dike Bridge or by four-wheel drive vehicle.

The Cape Poge Lighthouse can be seen in the final two shots in the film "Jaws", off to the right as Roy Scheider and Richard Dreyfuss swim back to shore.

== List of Keepers ==
- Mathew Mayhew (1801)
- Benjamin C. Smith (12 days - 1834)
- Lott Norton (1835)
- Aaron Norton (1844)
- Edward Worth (1850)
- Daniel Smith (1853)
- George Ripley Marchant (1859)
- Edward Worth (1866)
- Edward Worth (1867), Jethro Worth, Ass't
- Jethro Worth (1882)
- George H. Fisher (1883)
- George E. Dolby (1898)
- George E. Dolby (1900), Alfred A. Howard, Ass't
- Wallace A. Eldredge (1902), Alfred A. Howard, Ass't
- ? Westron, Ass't (1904)
- J.E. Barrus, Ass't (1904)
- J.E. Barrus (1908), Charles H. MacKay, Ass't, E.H. Hopkins (1913) Ass't
- Henry L. Thoms (1919), ? King, Ass't
- Albert S. Smith (1919) Ass't
- Henry L. Thomas (1921) (In 1921, Cape Pogue Light becomes one-man station)
- Marcus Pieffer (1931)
- Joseph H. DuBois (1938)
- Light automated in 1943

== See also ==
- National Register of Historic Places listings in Dukes County, Massachusetts
