= Cormier Woods =

Historical site

Coordinates: 42°04′08″N 71°35′38″W

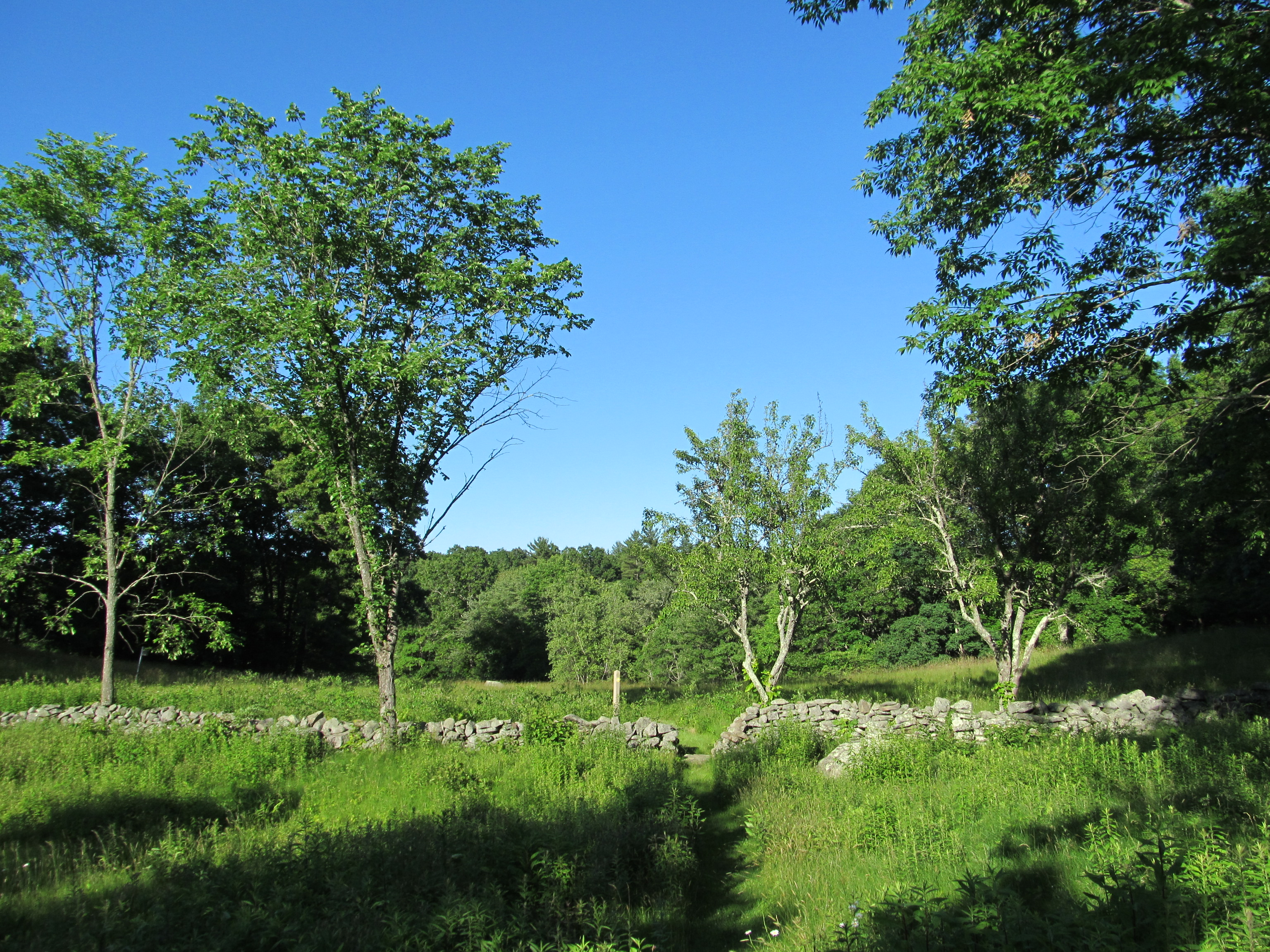
- Dolbear Trail
- Interactive map of Cormier Woods
- Established: 2008
- Operator: The Trustees of Reservations
- Website: Cormier Woods

Cormier Woods is a 175-acre (71 ha) open space preserve and historic 18th-century farm complex in Uxbridge, Massachusetts, USA, within the Blackstone River Valley National Heritage Corridor. The property is named for James Cormier, the former owner of the property. It was acquired in 2008 by the land conservation non-profit organization The Trustees of Reservations.

The reservation includes 3 miles (4.8 km) of hiking trails, farmland, woodlots, wetlands, a farmhouse, barn and sheds. It is open to hiking, picnicking, cross country skiing and hunting (in season). The reservation trailhead is on Chapin Street in Uxbridge.
