= Westport Town Farm =

Farm in Westport, Massachusetts, United States

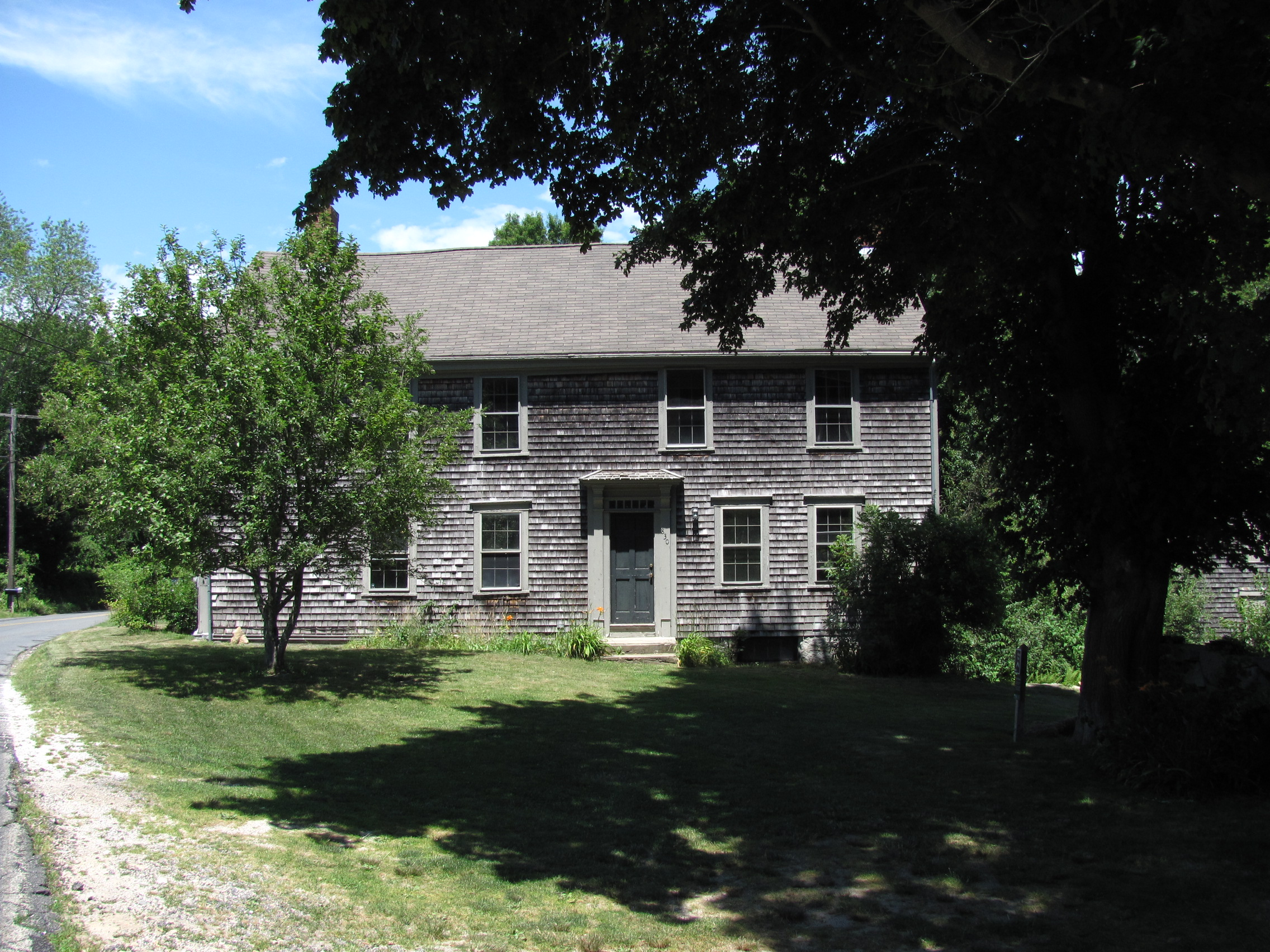
- Westport Town Farm
- Interactive map of Westport Town Farm
- Location: Massachusetts, United States
- Coordinates: 41°34′49.6″N 71°4′47.3″W
- Established: 2007
- Operator: The Trustees of Reservations
- Website: Westport Town Farm

Westport Town Farm is a 40-acre (16 ha) open space preserve and historic farm complex located in Westport, Massachusetts along the bracken East Branch of the Westport River. The property, owned by the town of Westport and managed by the land conservation non-profit organization The Trustees of Reservations through contract since 2007, was once the town's poor farm and local infirmary.

The preserve includes hiking trails, working farmland, salt marsh frontage, an antique farmhouse, dairy barn, corn crib, and stone walls dating back to Colonial times. It is open to hiking, picnicking, cross country skiing, canoeing, and kayaking. The preserve trailhead is located on Drift Road in Westport.
