= Boston Natural Areas Network =

- Abbreviation: BNAN
- Merged into: The Trustees of Reservations
- Formation: 1977; 49 years ago
- Dissolved: December 2014; 11 years ago
- Headquarters: Boston, Massachusetts

The Boston Natural Areas Network (BNAN) was a non-profit organization based in Boston, in the U.S. state of Massachusetts founded in 1977, which worked to identify and protect significant natural areas described as urban wilds and greenways in the metropolitan area. After 7 years of being an affiliate of The Trustees of Reservations, in December 2014 BNAN officially merged with the Trustees, and became part of the Trustees Boston Region.

== Mission ==
The Boston Natural Areas Network worked to preserve, expand and improve urban open space through community organizing, acquisition, ownership, programming, development and management of special kinds of urban land–urban wilds, greenways and community gardens. In all of its endeavors, BNAN was guided by local citizens advocating for their open spaces and assisting them to preserve and shape their communities.

== History ==
Originally named the Boston Natural Areas Fund, the organization was founded by a small group of citizens in response to a Boston Redevelopment Authority report titled Boston Urban Wilds. The report cited nearly 150 unprotected sites of natural beauty, undeveloped areas and under-developed areas, including community gardens, each of environmental significance, all of which faced encroachment from a rapid expansion in development taking place. Within five years, the organization, working with local neighborhood groups, had begun acquiring properties and setting in place protection from future development.

== See also ==
- Emerald Necklace
- South End Lower Roxbury Open Space Land Trust
- The Trustees of Reservations
