= The Trustees of Reservations =

Preservation and conservation nonprofit organization in MA, US (established 1891)

- Established: 1891; 135 years ago
- Founder: Charles Eliot
- Headquarters: 200 High Street, Boston, Massachusetts, USA
- Members: 100,000 households (2021)
- President: Katie Theoharides
- Website: www.thetrustees.org

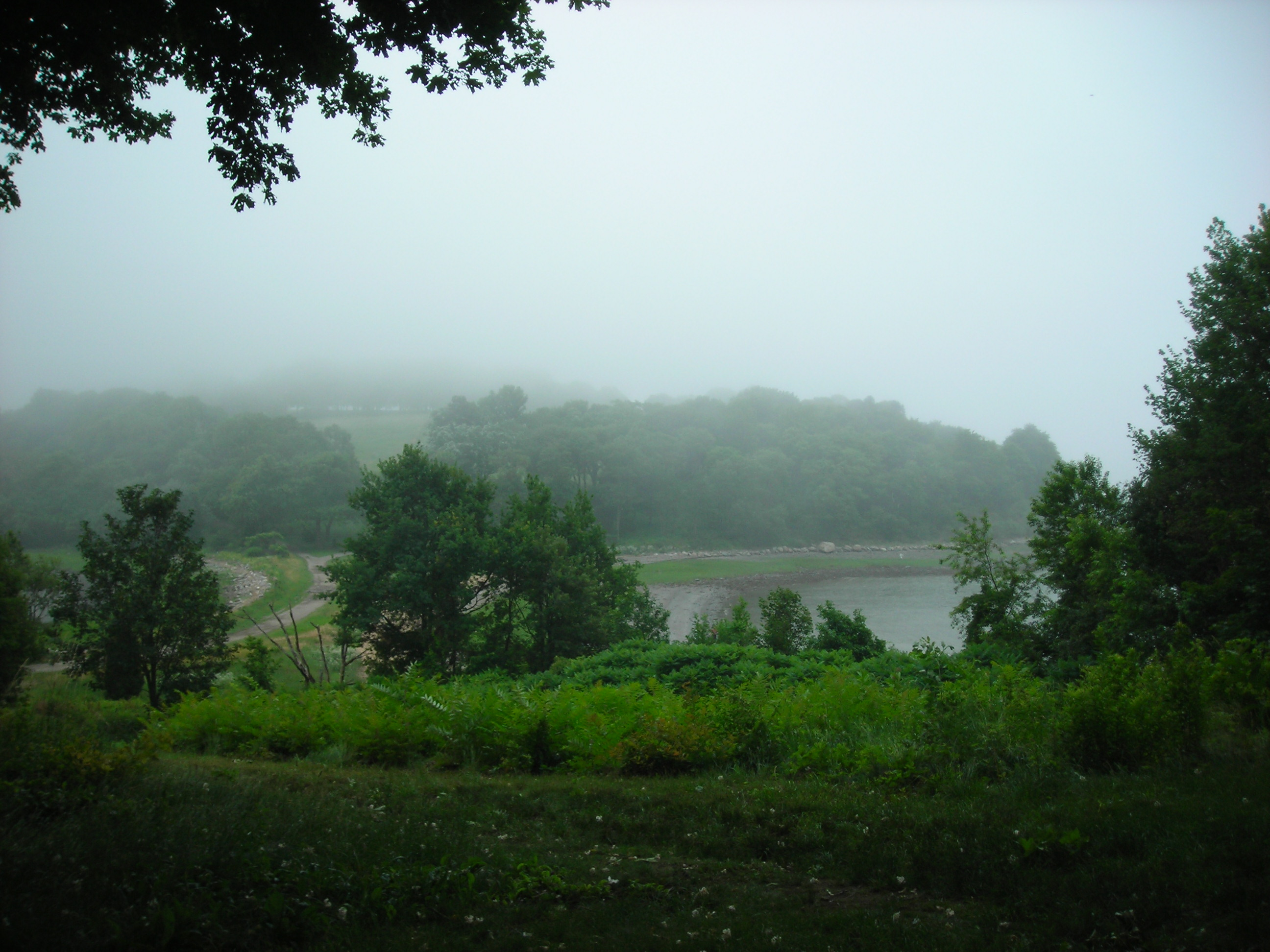
The Trustees of Reservation's World's End reservation

The Trustees of Reservations (also referred to as Trustees or The Trustees after a 2021 rebranding) is a non-profit land conservation and historic preservation organization dedicated to preserving natural and historical places in the Commonwealth of Massachusetts. Founded by landscape architect Charles Eliot in 1891, it is the oldest land conservation nonprofit organization of its kind in the world and has 100,000 member households as of 2021. In addition to land stewardship, the organization is also active in conservation partnerships, community supported agriculture (CSA), environmental and conservation education, community preservation and development, and green building. The Trustees owns title to 120 properties on 27,000 acres (11,000 ha) in Massachusetts, all of which are open to the public. In addition, it holds 393 conservation restrictions to protect an additional 20,000 acres (8,100 ha). Properties include historic mansions, estates, and gardens; woodland preserves; waterfalls; mountain peaks; wetlands and riverways; coastal bluffs, beaches, and barrier islands; farmland and CSA projects; and archaeological sites.

The main office of the organization was formerly at Long Hill in Beverly. In 2017, a new headquarters was established in Boston. The Trustees Archives & Research Center (ARC) is located in Sharon. In June 2006, The Trustees earned gold-level recognition from the United States Green Building Council for its Doyle Conservation Center in Leominster.

Financial support for the organization comes from membership dues, annual contributions, property admission fees, special events, grants, and endowments. In 2014, after seven years as an affiliate, the Boston Natural Areas Network merged with the Trustees.

== History ==
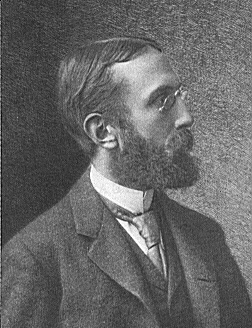
Charles Eliot

The Trustees of Reservations was proposed in 1890 when the New England periodical Garden and Forest published a letter by landscape architect Charles Eliot (protégé of Frederick Law Olmsted) entitled "The Waverly Oaks." Eliot's letter proposed the immediate preservation of "special bits of scenery" still remaining "within ten miles (16 km) of the State House which possess uncommon beauty and more than usual refreshing power." To this end, Eliot proposed that legislation be enacted to create a nonprofit corporation to hold land for the public to enjoy "just as a Public Library holds books and an Art Museum holds pictures."

In the spring of 1891, the Massachusetts Legislature established The Trustees of Public Reservations "for the purposes of acquiring, holding, maintaining and opening to the public beautiful and historic places within the Commonwealth." The act was signed into law by Governor William E. Russell on May 21, 1891. The word "Public" was dropped from the organization's name in 1954 to avoid confusion with government-owned land.

Virginia Wood in Stoneham was the first property acquired by The Trustees. This property was conveyed to the Metropolitan District Commission in 1923 and is now a part of the Middlesex Fells Reservation. Waverly Oaks itself was also conveyed to the state by The Trustees and is part of the Beaver Brook Reservation, established in 1893.

In 1925, The Trustees joined with the Appalachian Mountain Club, Massachusetts Audubon Society, and the Society for the Preservation of New England Antiquities (now Historic New England) to organize a conference on "The Needs and Uses of Open Spaces." This conference led to a 1929 report by the Governor's Committee on Needs and Uses of Open Spaces that emphasized the need to protect the state's rural character and countryside and the importance of identifying and describing the qualities and characteristics of specific sites that should be preserved. The report included a "Map of existing and proposed open spaces". Today, nearly every site listed in the report is protected by a government or nonprofit conservation agency.

The 1929 report included a proposal by Benton MacKaye, the creator of the Appalachian Trail, to build a "Bay Circuit Trail" encircling Boston from Plum Island to Duxbury. Work to build the Bay Circuit Trail began in 1990 when the Bay Circuit Alliance was created.

Six individuals have served The Trustees as President and CEO. Andrew Kendall held the position from 2000 to 2012. Barbara Erickson, the first woman to serve in the role, was appointed in 2012. John Judge was appointed in 2021. Katie Theoharides was appointed in 2023.

== Mission and initiatives ==
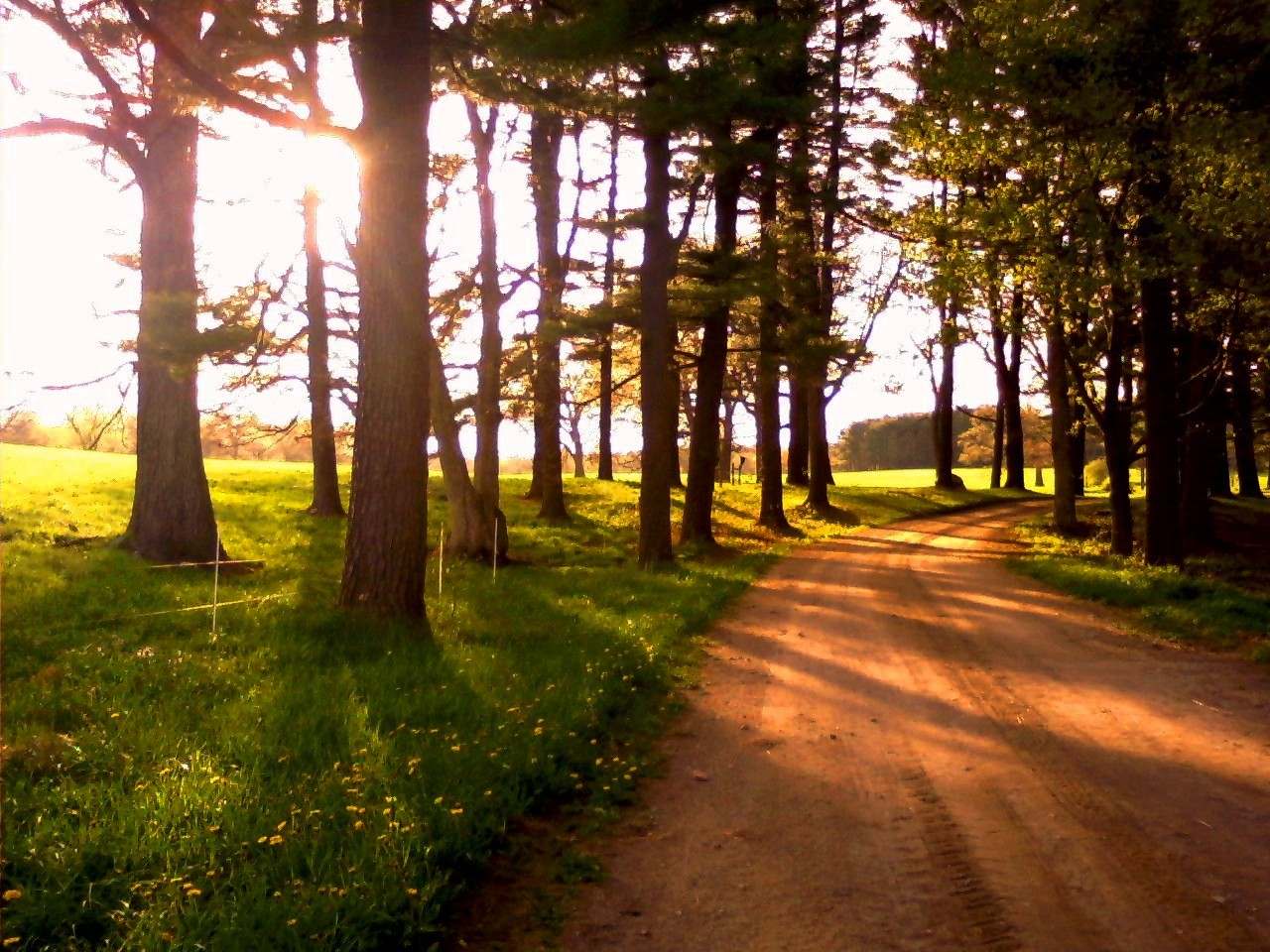
Appleton Farms

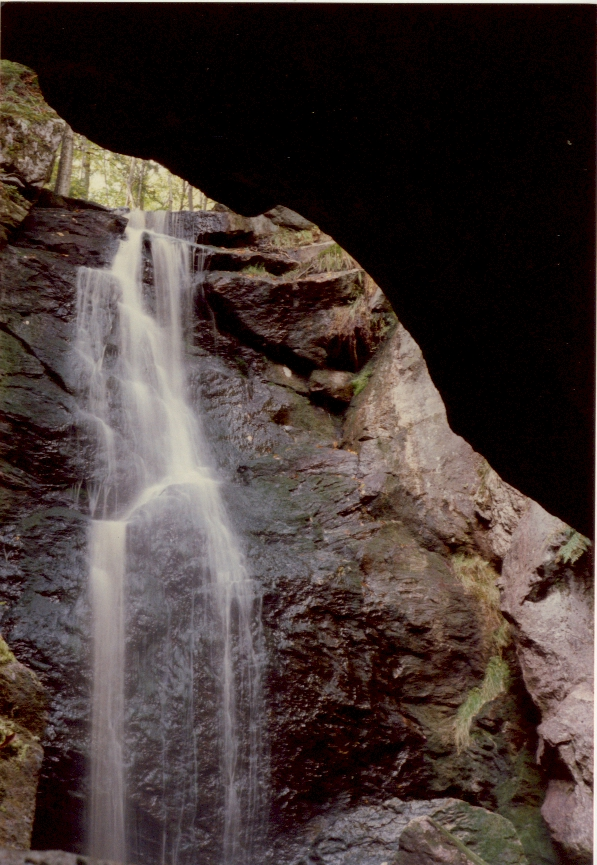
The Tully Trail passes Royalston Falls

The purpose of The Trustees is "to protect and share the Massachusetts places people love for their exceptional scenic, historic, and ecological value."

=== Initiatives ===
The Doyle Conservation Center is a green architecture initiative and regional office, conference, and education center located in Doyle Community Park in Leominster, Massachusetts. The structure, designed by HKT Architects of Somerville, Massachusetts and landscape architects Hines Wasser & Associates, was registered for a Leadership in Energy and Environmental Design gold certification with the United States Green Building Council. The building includes "photovoltaic panels, high-efficiency lighting and controls, a displacement ventilation system, high performance windows, a high performance building envelope, geothermal wells and carbon dioxide monitoring systems;" it incorporates green materials such as desks made of sunflower seeds, bamboo and cork flooring, and recycled fiber carpet and paneling.

==== Former Initiatives ====
The Putnam Conservation Institute, also known as the Conservation Common, was active from 2007 to 2012. It offered workshops, conferences, and networking for land conservationists, urban park advocates, historic preservationists, watershed associations, state agencies, and municipal commissions.

The Highland Communities Initiative was a cooperative effort of The Trustees and community members from small hilltowns in The Berkshires geography dedicated to preserving regional cultural and physical landscapes and enhancing the quality of life of local residents.

=== Collaborative conservation ===
Copicut Woods, Slocum's River Reserve, the Tully Trail, and Appleton Farms represent collaborative efforts of The Trustees, government agencies, local communities, and private groups to create a bioreserve, a mixed use open space preserve, a 22-mile (35 km) recreation trail, and a mixed use and community supported agriculture preserve, respectively. Copicut Woods is part of the cooperatively managed Southeastern Massachusetts Bioreserve which protects 13,600 acres (5,500 ha) of forest in Fall River, Freetown and Dartmouth, Massachusetts. Slocum's River Reserve is a cooperative effort by the state, The Trustees and the Dartmouth Natural Resources Trust and includes protected braken river frontage and farming conservation restrictions. The Tully Trail, in northern Worcester County, is a collaborative recreational project of The Trustees, the Mount Grace Land Conservation Trust, Harvard University's Harvard Forest, the National Park Service, the New England Forestry Foundation, state agencies, and the United States Army Corps of Engineers. Appleton Farms of Ipswich is a combination CSA project, retail feed and mulch haying operation, livestock and dairy program, recreation area, and ecological preservation area; it includes experiential education programs for adults and children. Current conservation projects include cooperative efforts on the Mount Tom Range and interpretive development of the birthplace of suffragist Lucy Stone in West Brookfield.

== Properties ==
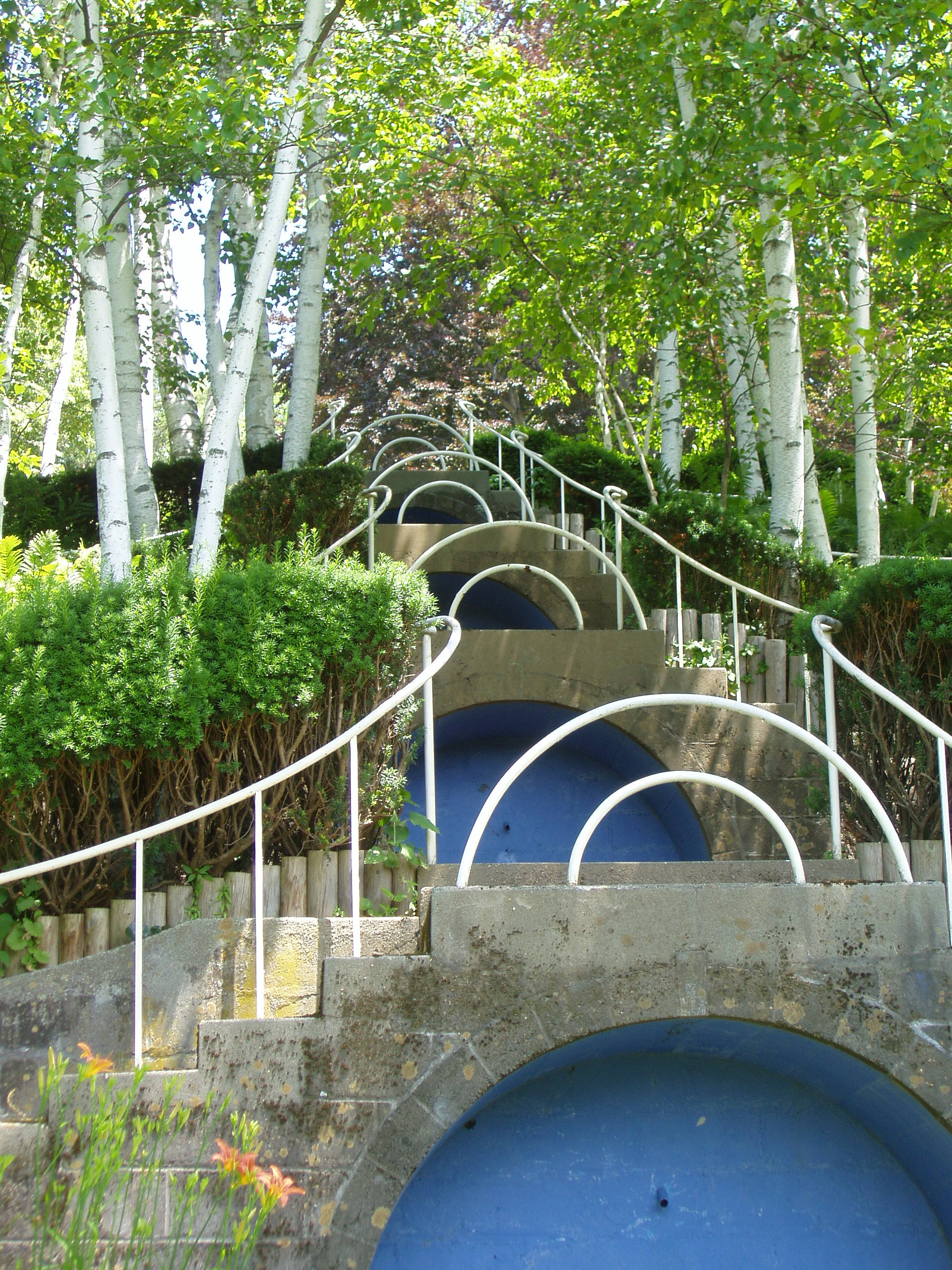
The Blue Steps of Naumkeag

See List of properties managed by The Trustees of Reservations

The Trustees owns and manages a broad range of properties across the state of Massachusetts. Many properties contain historic buildings, including nine historic house museums and two lighthouses open to the public. The Trustees manages five National Historic Landmarks, one National Natural Landmark, and several properties that are listed on the National Register of Historic Places. In addition, The Trustees manages, per contract, the Tully Lake Campground in Royalston and the Westport Town Farm. Until 2023, the Trustees managed Norton Point Beach in Edgartown, which is owned by Dukes County.

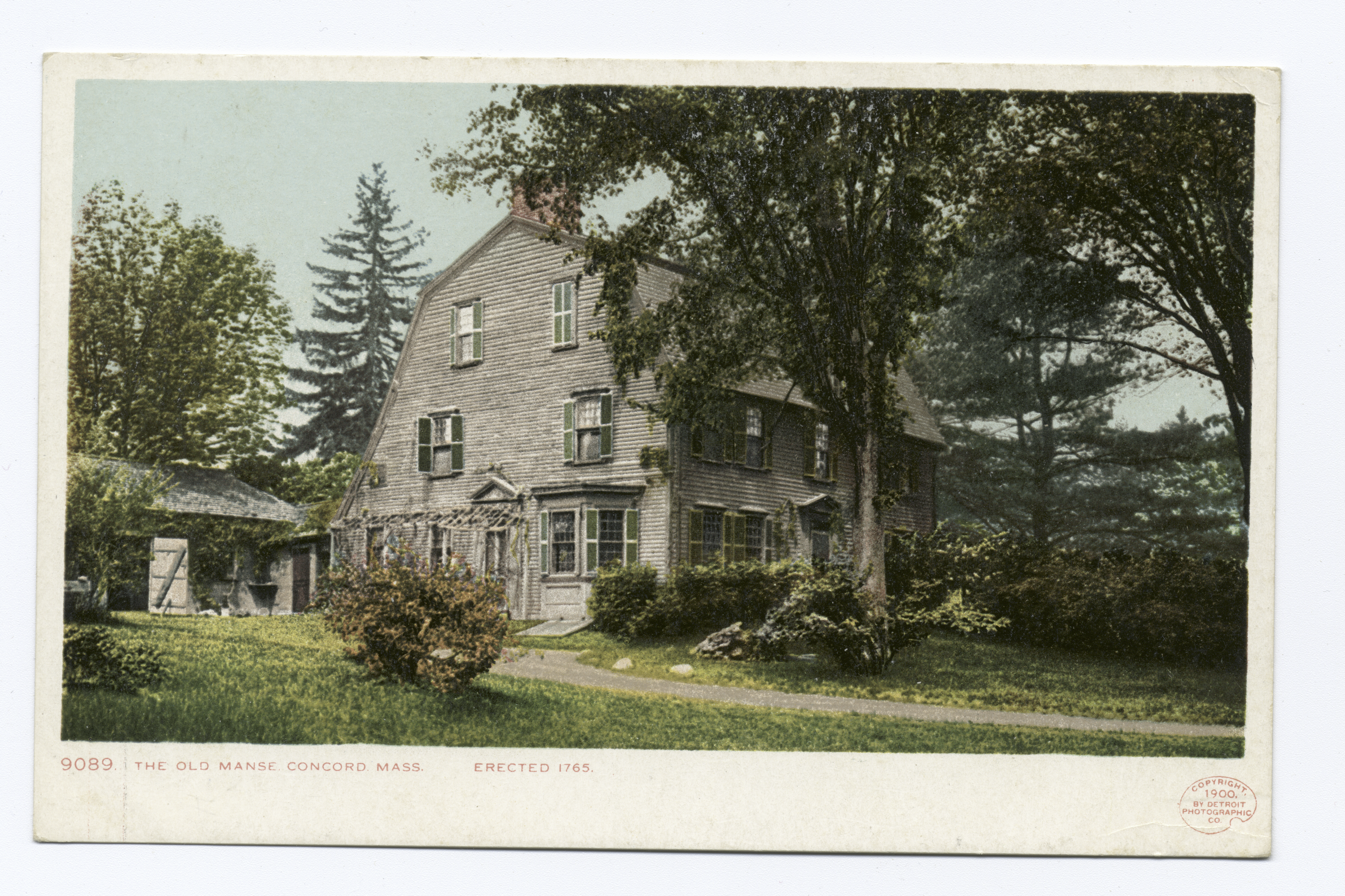
The Old Manse, Concord

Notable properties include:

- Bartholomew's Cobble of Sheffield, a National Natural Landmark containing North America's greatest diversity of fern species
- Cape Poge Wildlife Refuge, a barrier island located on Martha's Vineyard
- Crane Beach and the Castle Hill mansion of Ipswich, a barrier beach and National Historic Landmark
- Dinosaur Footprints, a rock face in Holyoke containing 134 footprints of Triassic dinosaur species
- Doane's Falls and Royalston Falls, popular waterfalls located in Royalston
- Fruitlands Museum and the DeCordova Museum, two properties that include art museums
- Naumkeag, a gilded-age historic mansion and National Historic Landmark located in Stockbridge
- The Old Manse of Concord, built by William Emerson and his wife Phebe Bliss Emerson in 1770, and made famous by transcendentalist writer, Ralph Waldo Emerson (grandson of William and Phebe Emerson), novelist, Nathaniel Hawthorne, and the "shot heard round the world" at the North Bridge in the backyard of the house that marked the beginning of the Revolutionary War on April 19, 1775.
- World's End on Boston Harbor, a coastal peninsula park transformed from an unrealized Frederick Law Olmsted residential subdivision design

Moose Hill Farm in Sharon and Cormier Woods in Uxbridge are some of the most recent acquisitions.

== See also ==
- Historic New England
- List of properties managed by The Trustees of Reservations
- Natural landscape
- National Trust for Historic Preservation
