= William Cullen Bryant =

American writer & journalist (1794–1878)

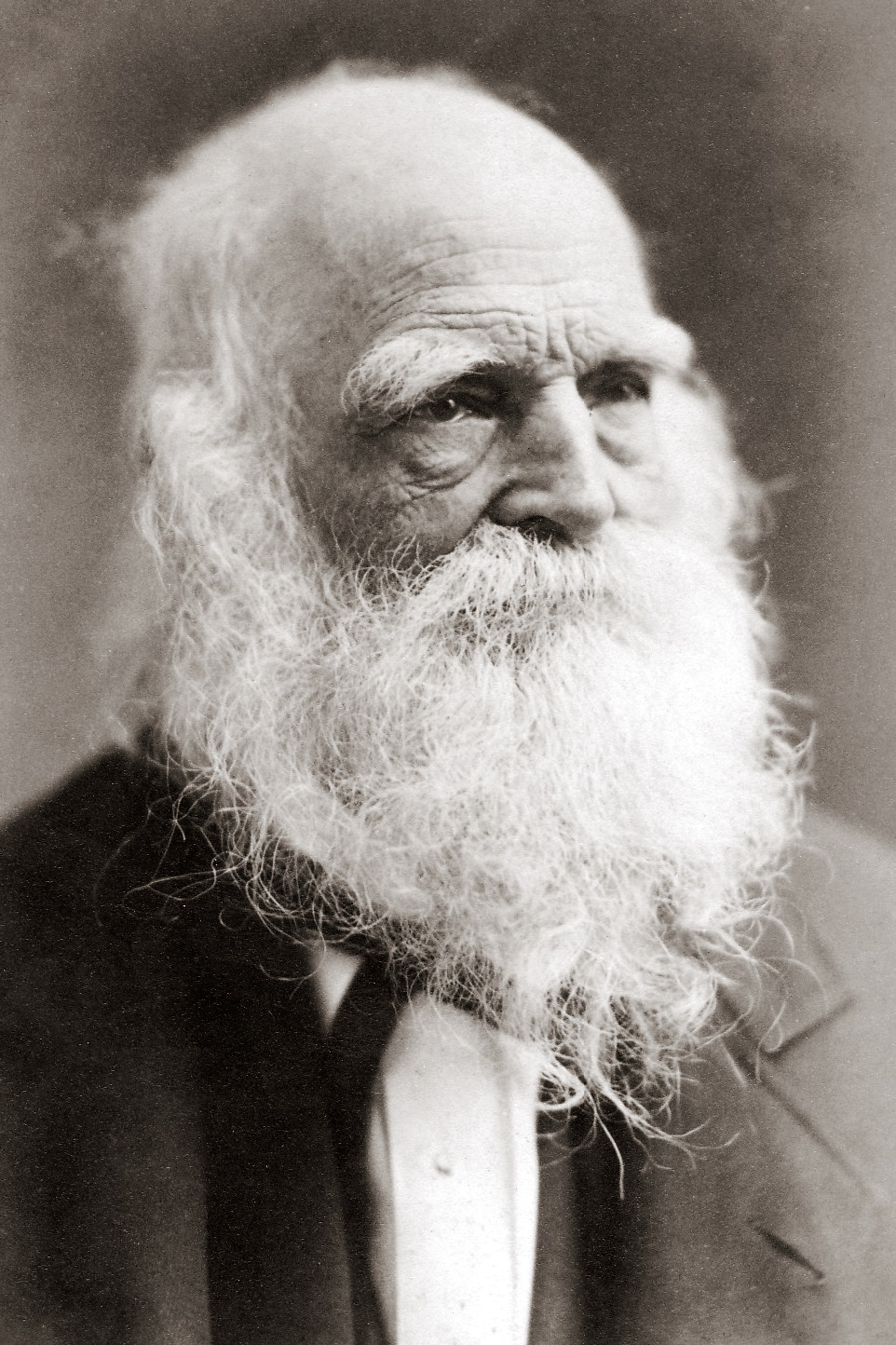
- Cabinet card of Bryant by José Maria Mora, c. 1876
- Born: November 3, 1794; Cummington, Massachusetts, U.S.
- Died: June 12, 1878 (aged 83); New York City, U.S.
- Resting place: Roslyn Cemetery, Greenvale, New York, U.S.
- Education: Williams College
- Occupations: Poet; journalist; editor
- Relatives: Charity Bryant, Sylvia Drake (aunts); Edwin Bryant (cousin)
- Writing career
- Notable work: "Thanatopsis"

Signature
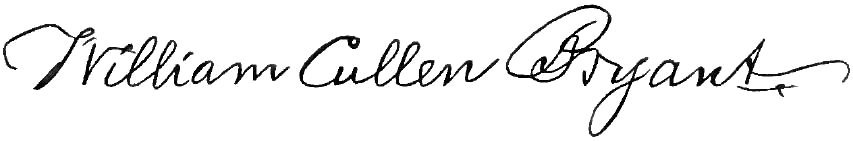

William Cullen Bryant (November 3, 1794 – June 12, 1878) was an American romantic poet, journalist, and long-time editor of the New-York Evening Post. Born in Massachusetts, he started his career as a lawyer but showed an interest in poetry early in his life.

In 1825, Bryant relocated to New York City, where he became an editor of two major newspapers. He also emerged as one of the most significant poets in early literary America and has been grouped among the fireside poets for his accessible and popular poetry.

== Early life and education ==
Bryant was born on November 3, 1794, in a log cabin near Cummington, Massachusetts; the home of his birth is commemorated with a plaque. He was the second son of Peter Bryant (August 12, 1767 – March 20, 1820), a physician and later a state legislator, and Sarah Snell (December 4, 1768 – May 6, 1847). The genealogy of his mother traces back to passengers on the Mayflower, including John Alden (1599–1687), his wife Priscilla Mullins, and her parents William and Alice Mullins. The story of the romance between John and Priscilla is the subject of a famous narrative poem The Courtship of Miles Standish, by Henry Wadsworth Longfellow, who was also their descendant.

He was the nephew of Charity Bryant, a Vermont-based seamstress, who is the subject of Rachel Hope Cleves's 2014 book, Charity and Sylvia: A Same-Sex Marriage in Early America. Bryant described their relationship: "If I were permitted to draw the veil of private life, I would briefly give you the singular, and to me interesting, story of two maiden ladies who dwell in this valley. I would tell you how, in their youthful days, they took each other as companions for life, and how this union, no less sacred to them than the tie of marriage, has subsisted, in uninterrupted harmony, for more than forty years." Charity and Sylvia Drake are buried together at Weybridge Hill Cemetery in Weybridge, Vermont.

Bryant and his family moved to a new home when he was two years old. Bryant's boyhood home, William Cullen Bryant Homestead, is now a museum. After just one year at Williams College, which he entered with sophomore standing, Bryant hoped to transfer to Yale. But a talk with his father led him to realize that the family's finances could not support it. His father advised Bryant to purse a legal career as his best available choice, and the disappointed poet began to study law in Worthington and Bridgewater in Massachusetts.

In 1815, Bryant was admitted to the bar and began practicing law in nearby Plainfield, walking the seven miles from Cummington every day. On one of these walks, in December 1815, he noticed a single bird flying on the horizon; the sight moved him enough to write "To a Waterfowl".

Bryant developed his interest in poetry early in life. Under his father's tutelage, he emulated Alexander Pope and other Neo-Classic British poets. "The Embargo", a critical work on President Thomas Jefferson published in 1808, reflected Bryant's Federalist political views. The first edition quickly sold out, partly because of publicity attached to Bryant's young age at the time of its publication. A second, expanded edition included Bryant's translation of classical verse. During his collegiate studies and his reading for the law, he wrote little poetry, but encounters with the Graveyard Poets and then William Wordsworth regenerated his passion for what Bryant called "the witchery of song."

== Career ==
=== Early poetry ===
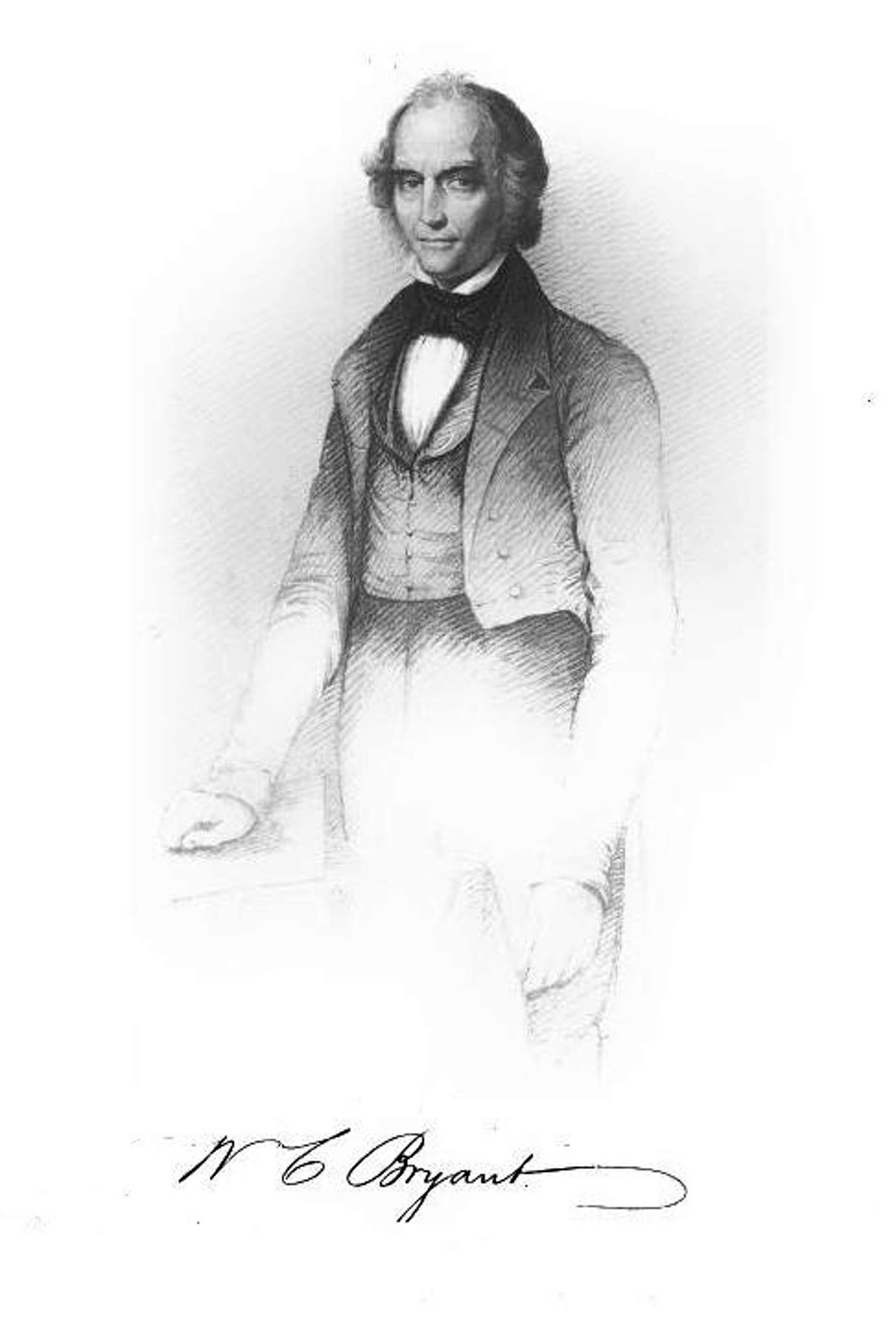
Engraving of Bryant, c. 1843

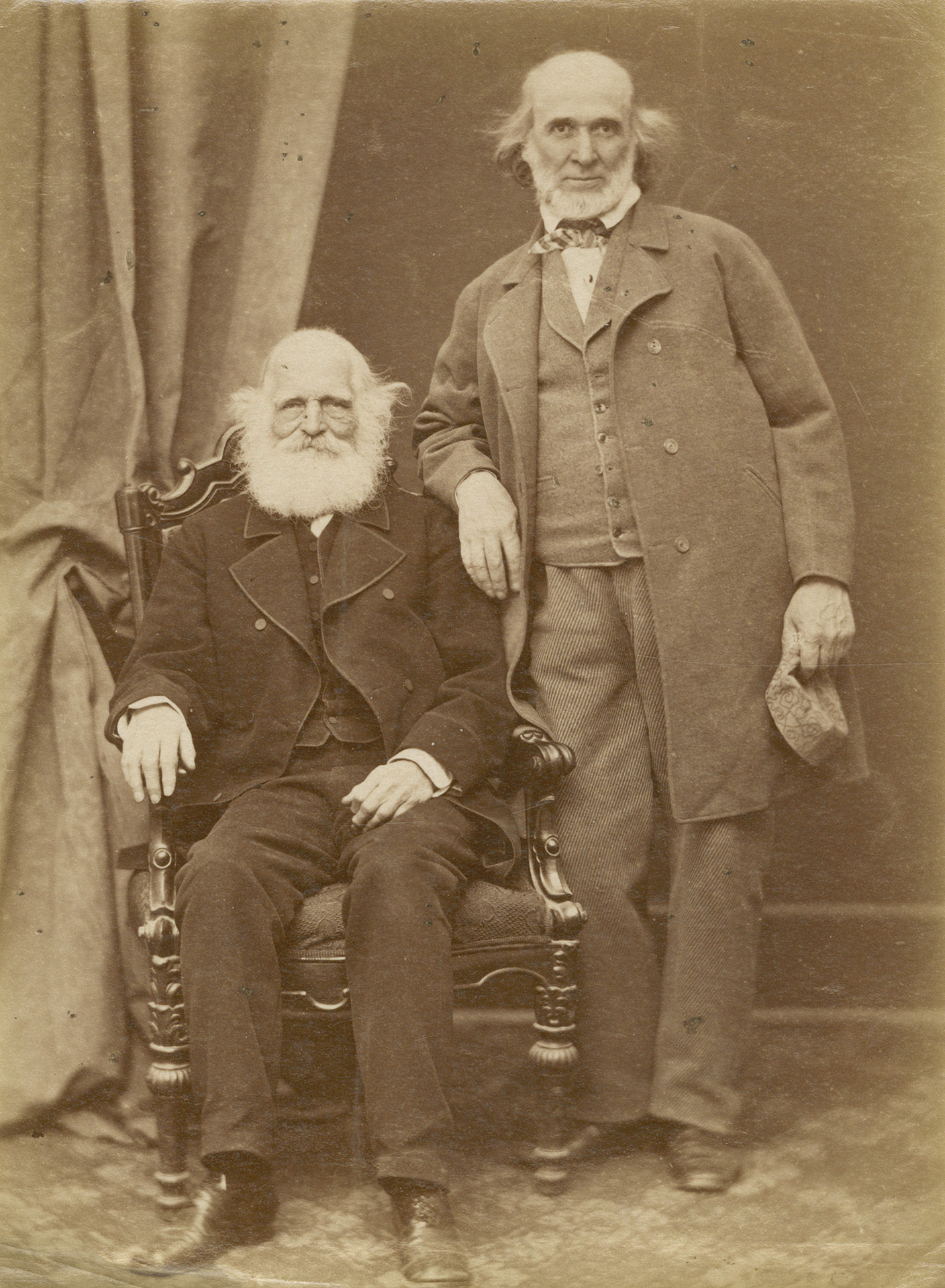
An 1867 portrait of Hiram Powers and Bryant, now housed at the National Gallery of Art, in Washington, D.C.

"Thanatopsis" is Bryant's most famous poem, which Bryant may have been working on as early as 1811.

In 1817, his father took some pages of verse from his son's desk, and at the invitation of Willard Phillips, an editor of the North American Review who had previously been tutored in the classics by Bryant, submitted them along with his own work. The editor of the Review, Edward Tyrrel Channing, read the poem to associate editor Richard Henry Dana Sr., who immediately exclaimed, "That was never written on this side of the water!"

Someone at the North American joined two of the son's discrete fragments, gave the result the Greek-derived title Thanatopsis ("meditation on death"), mistakenly attributed it to the father, and published it. After clarification of the authorship, the son's poems began appearing with some regularity in the Review. A portion of Bryant's poem, Thanatopsis, is at the base of the William Cullen Bryant Memorial behind the New York Public Library, which was dedicated in 1911. "To a Waterfowl", published in 1821, was the most popular.

On January 11, 1821, still striving to build a legal career, Bryant married Frances Fairchild. Soon after, he received an invitation to speak from Phi Beta Kappa at Harvard University to deliver the August commencement. Bryant spent months working on "The Ages", a panorama in verse of the history of civilization, culminating in the establishment of the United States. He subsequently published "The Ages", which led the volume and was titled Poems, which he arranged to publish on the same trip to Harvard. For that book, he added sets of lines at the beginning and end of "Thanatopsis" that changed the poem.

"Thanatopsis" established Bryant's career as a poet. From 1816 to 1825, Bryant depended on his law practice in Great Barrington, Massachusetts to sustain his family financially but he traded his unrewarding profession for New York City and the promise of a literary career. With the encouragement of a distinguished and well-connected literary family, the Sedgwicks, he quickly gained a foothold in New York City's vibrant cultural life.

By 1832, after publishing an expanded version of Poems in the U.S. and, with the assistance of Washington Irving, in Great Britain, Bryant began to be recognized as one of his generation's greatest poets.

=== New-York Review ===
Bryant's first employment, in 1825, was as editor of the New-York Review, which merged with the United States Review and Literary Gazette the following year, in 1826. Bryant's stories over the seven-year period from his time with the Review to the publication of Tales of Glauber Spa in 1832 show a variety of strategies, making him the most inventive of practitioners of the genre during this early stage of its evolution.

=== New-York Evening Post ===
In the throes of the failing struggle to raise subscriptions, he accepted part-time duties with the New-York Evening Post under William Coleman; then, partly because of Coleman's ill health, traceable to the consequences of a duel and then a stroke, Bryant's responsibilities expanded rapidly. From assistant editor he rose to editor-in-chief and co-owner of the newspaper that had been founded by Alexander Hamilton. Over the next half century, the Post would become the most respected paper in the city and, from the election of Andrew Jackson, the major platform in the Northeast for the Democratic Party and subsequently of the Free Soil and Republican Parties. In the process, the Evening-Post also became the pillar of a substantial fortune. Despite his Federalist beginnings, Bryant had shifted to being one of the most liberal voices of the century. In 1848, Bryant took on John Bigelow as a partner and co-owner, after Bigelow was able to borrow money from Charles O'Conor to buy his share.

An early supporter of organized labor, with his 1836 editorials asserting the right of workmen to strike, Bryant also defended religious minorities and immigrants, and promoted the abolition of slavery. He "threw himself into the foreground of the battle for human rights" and did not cease speaking out against the corrupting influence of certain bankers in spite of their efforts to break down the paper. According to newspaper historian Frank Luther Mott, Bryant was "a great liberal seldom done justice by modern writers".

He was elected an associate fellow of the American Academy of Arts and Sciences in 1855.

Despite his once staunch opposition to Thomas Jefferson and his party, Bryant became one of the key supporters in the Northeast of that same party under Jackson. Bryant's views, always progressive though not quite populist, led him to join the Free Soilers when the Free Soil Party became a core of the new Republican Party in 1856.

Bryant vigorously campaigned for John C. Frémont, which enhanced his standing in party councils. In 1860, he was one of the prime Eastern exponents of Abraham Lincoln, and Bryant introduced Lincoln at Cooper Union prior to his Cooper Union speech, which was considered influential in lifting Lincoln to the nomination and then the presidency. In the 1860 presidential election, he elected Lincoln and Hannibal Hamlin as a presidential elector.

=== Picturesque America ===
Bryant edited Picturesque America, which was published between 1872 and 1874. This two-volume set was lavishly illustrated and described scenic places in the United States and Canada.

=== Translation of Homer ===
In his final years, Bryant shifted from writing his own poetry to a blank verse translation of Homer's works. He assiduously worked on the Iliad and The Odyssey from 1871 to 1874. He is also remembered as one of the principal authorities on homeopathy and as a hymnist for the Unitarian Church, both legacies of his father's influence on him.

In 1843, Bryant bought a house in Roslyn Harbor on Long Island. He christened and named the house Cedarmere because of the cedar trees around its pond.

In 1865, he bought the farmhouse in Cummington, where he grew up and summered annually until his death. He made substantial improvements to the houses at both properties. He was known for his attention to trees on his land, and later in life he expressed concerns that deforestation in the United States would prove disastrous for American agriculture.

== Death ==
Bryant died in 1878 of complications from an accidental fall suffered after participating in a Central Park ceremony to honor Italian patriot Giuseppe Mazzini. He is buried at Roslyn Cemetery in Greenvale, New York.

== Critical response ==
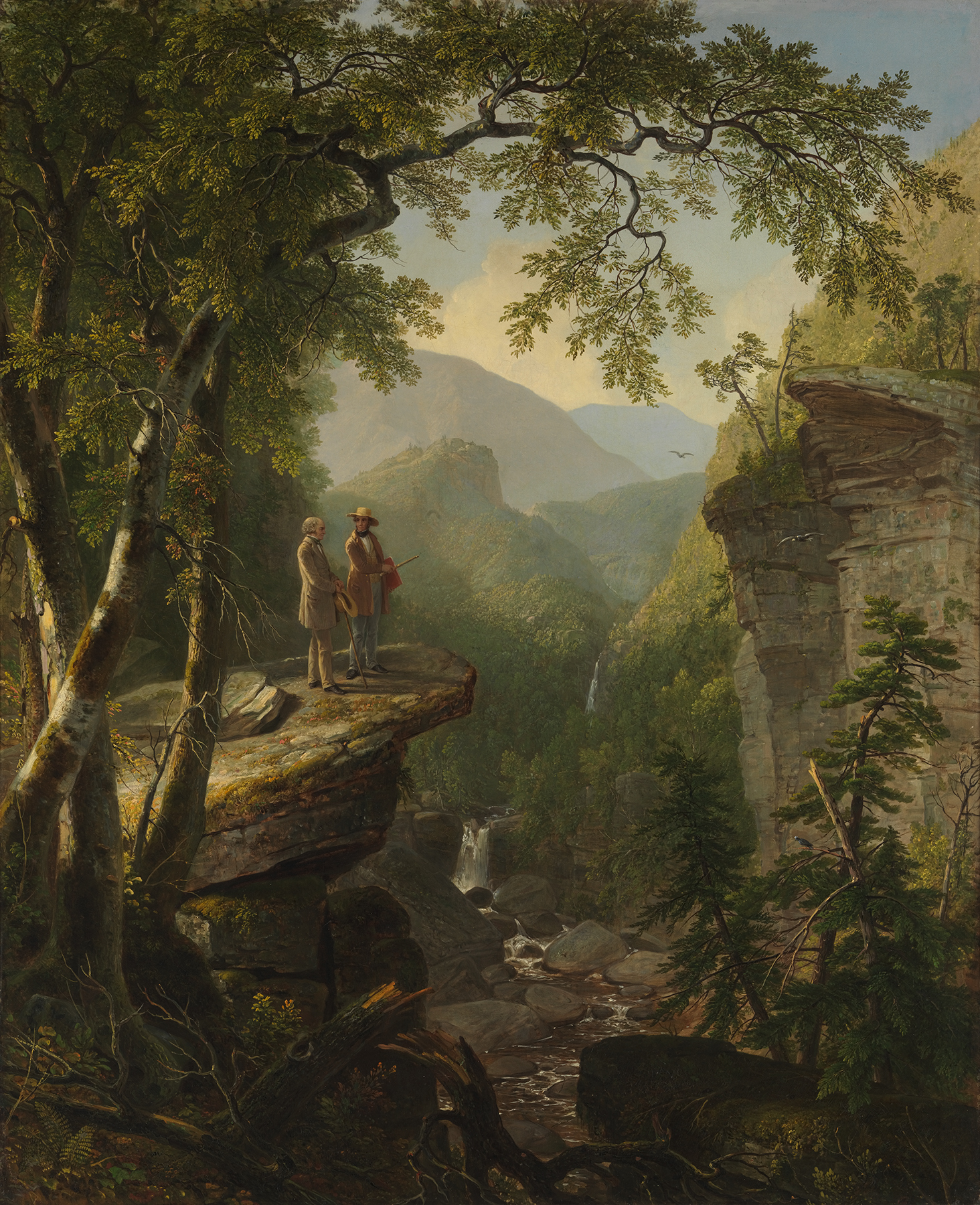
Kindred Spirits, an 1849 portrait by Asher Durand, depicting Bryant with Thomas Cole

Bryant became one of the most significant poets in early American literary history. He is typically included among the group of poets referred to as the fireside poets, along with Longfellow, John Greenleaf Whittier, James Russell Lowell, and Oliver Wendell Holmes Sr. They are considered to be among the first American poets whose popularity rivaled that of British poets, both at home and abroad and are so named because their writing was a source of entertainment for families gathered around the fire at home. Bryant's poetry has been described as being "of a thoughtful, meditative character, and makes but slight appeal to the mass of readers."

Edgar Allan Poe praised Bryant and specifically the poem "June" in his essay "The Poetic Principle":

The rhythmical flow, here, is even voluptuous—nothing could be more melodious. The poem has always affected me in a remarkable manner. The intense melancholy which seems to well up, perforce, to the surface of all the poet's cheerful sayings about his grave, we find thrilling us to the soul—while there is the truest poetic elevation in the thrill. The impression left is one of a pleasurable sadness.

Editor and children's writer Mary Mapes Dodge wrote that Bryant's poems "have wrought vast and far-reaching good in the world." She predicted, "You will admire more and more, as you grow older, the noble poems of this great and good man." Poet and literary critic Thomas Holley Chivers said that the "only thing [Bryant] ever wrote that may be called Poetry is 'Thanatopsis', which he stole line for line from the Spanish. The fact is, that he never did anything but steal—as nothing he ever wrote is original." Writer and critic John Neal wrote in American Writers (1824–25): "Mr. B. is not and never will be a good poet. He wants fire—he wants the very rashness of a poet—the prodigality and fervor of those who are overflowing with inspiration." This critique may have influenced Lowell, who wrote a very similar criticism in his 1848 poem A Fable for Critics.

Bryant's poetry is tender and graceful, pervaded by a contemplative melancholy, and a love of solitude and the silence of the woods. Though he was brought up to admire Pope, and in his early youth imitated him, he was one of the first American poets to throw off his influence. Bryant had an interest in science and in geology especially. Thomas Cole was a friend and both, at different times, considered the "geological structure" of Volterra in Italy. He met Charles Lyell in England in 1845.

As a writer, Bryant was an early advocate of American literary nationalism, and his own poetry focusing on nature as a metaphor for truth established a central pattern in the American literary tradition.

Some however, argue that a reassessment is long overdue. It finds great merit in a couple of short stories Bryant wrote while trying to build interest in periodicals he edited. More importantly, it perceives a poet of great technical sophistication who was a progenitor of Walt Whitman, to whom he was a mentor.

== Legacy ==
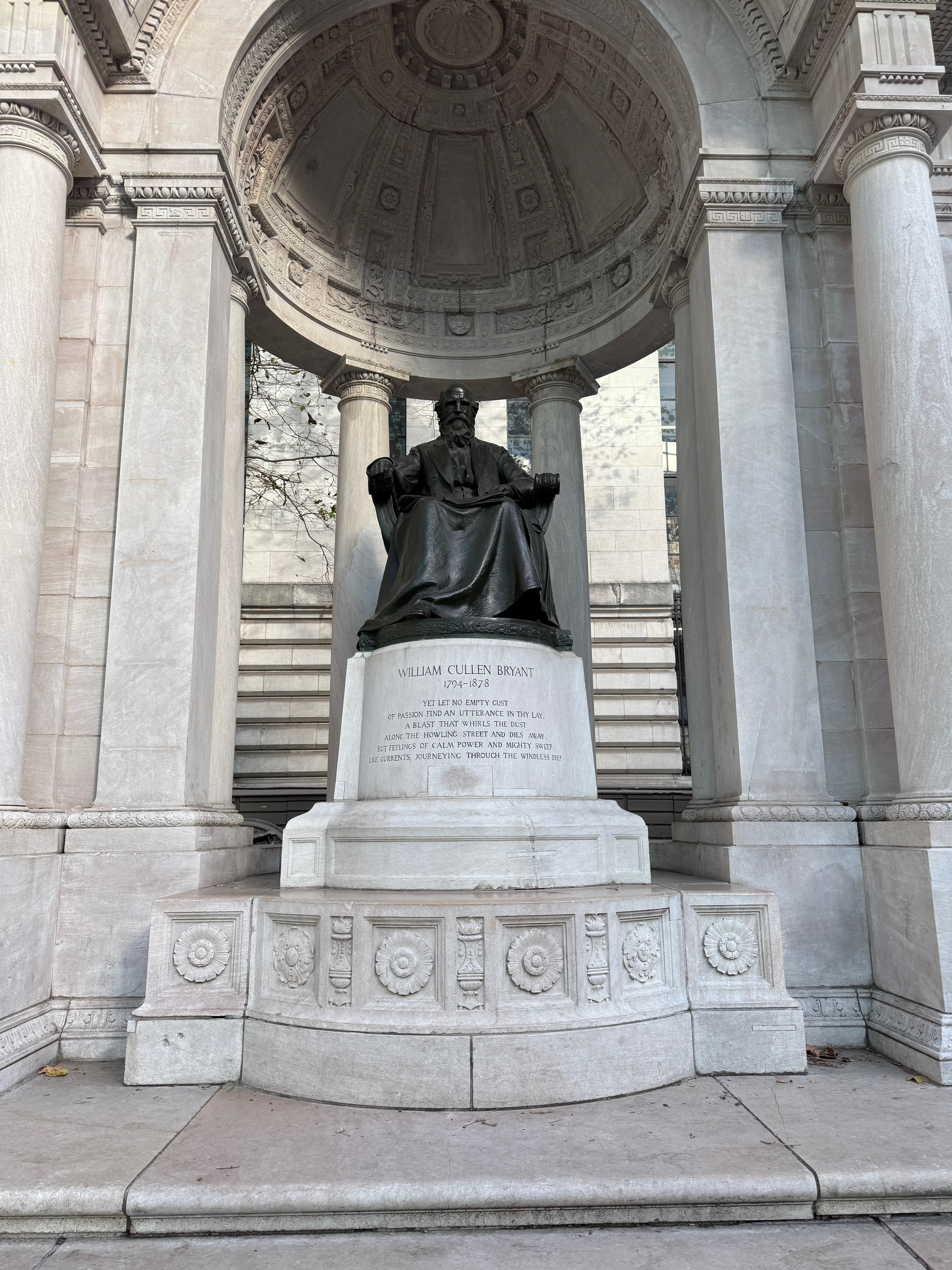
William Cullen Bryant Memorial, a statue of Bryant in Bryant Park next to the New York Public Library in Midtown Manhattan

Although Bryant was born in New England, where his family had deep ties, he spent almost all of his life as a devout and influential New Yorker. He helped conceive of the idea of a large park in Manhattan, which ultimately led to development of Central Park. He also was a leading proponent of creating the Metropolitan Museum of Art, and he was one of a group of founders of New York Medical College as well as the Century Association. He had close affinities with the Hudson River School of art and was a close friend of Thomas Cole.

In 1884, in recognition of Bryant, Reservoir Square, at the intersection of 42nd Street and Sixth Avenue, was renamed Bryant Park. Reservoir Square was behind New York City's massive above-ground reservoir, on Fifth Avenue. In 1900 the reservoir was demolished and replaced by the main building of the New York Public Library. In 1915, a statue of William Cullen Bryant by sculptor Herbert Adams was one of the statues of "Eminent Americans" that surrounded The Palace of Fine Arts at the Panama Pacific International Exposition in San Francisco, California. The William Cullen Bryant Memorial in Bryant Park includes a bronze of the same work.

Just outside New York City, the Long Island village of Roslyn Harbor, New York is home to the William Cullen Bryant Preserve, located on land he formerly owned next to what is now the Nassau County Museum of Art. Bryant is also the namesake of the Bryant Library in Roslyn, New York, located near his Cedarmere Estate.

Other locations named after Bryant include: Bryant, a neighborhood in Seattle; Bryant Woods, one of the four original villages in Columbia, Maryland; Cullen Bryant Park in Toronto, Ontario; the Bryant Free Library in Cummington, Massachusetts; and the Bryant House at Williams College.

Several schools are named after Bryant, including William Cullen Bryant High School in Long Island City, New York, and elementary schools in Milwaukee, Wisconsin, Teaneck, New Jersey, Long Beach, California, Cleveland, Ohio, and Great Barrington, Massachusetts. A rural schoolhouse in Sanford, Maine was also named for Bryant.

The William Cullen Bryant Viaduct between Flower Hill and Roslyn, New York is named in honor of Bryant – as is The Bryant Library, which serves as the Roslyn community's public library.

Martin Luther King Jr. quoted Bryant in his speech "Give Us the Ballot", when he said, "there is something in this universe which justifies William Cullen Bryant in saying: 'Truth crushed to earth will rise again.'"

== See also ==
- Cullen, Saskatchewan and Bryant, Saskatchewan
