= Embargo (disambiguation) =

The term embargo commonly refers to economic sanctions, the partial or complete prohibition of commerce and trade with a particular country.

It may also refer to:

- Arms embargo, an embargo that applies to weaponry
- News embargo or press embargo, in journalism and public relations, a request by a source that the information or news provided by that source not be published until a certain date or certain conditions have been met
- Embargo (academic publishing), a period during which access to publications is not allowed to certain types of users
- Embargo (film), a 2010 Portuguese film
- Embargo (rail), a halt to all traffic on a damaged section (embargoed track) of a rail line not safely passable at any speed
- "The Embargo," a poem written by the American poet William Cullen Bryant in 1808
- Baggage embargo, a limitation on checked baggage
