= Sergei Isupov =

American ceramist

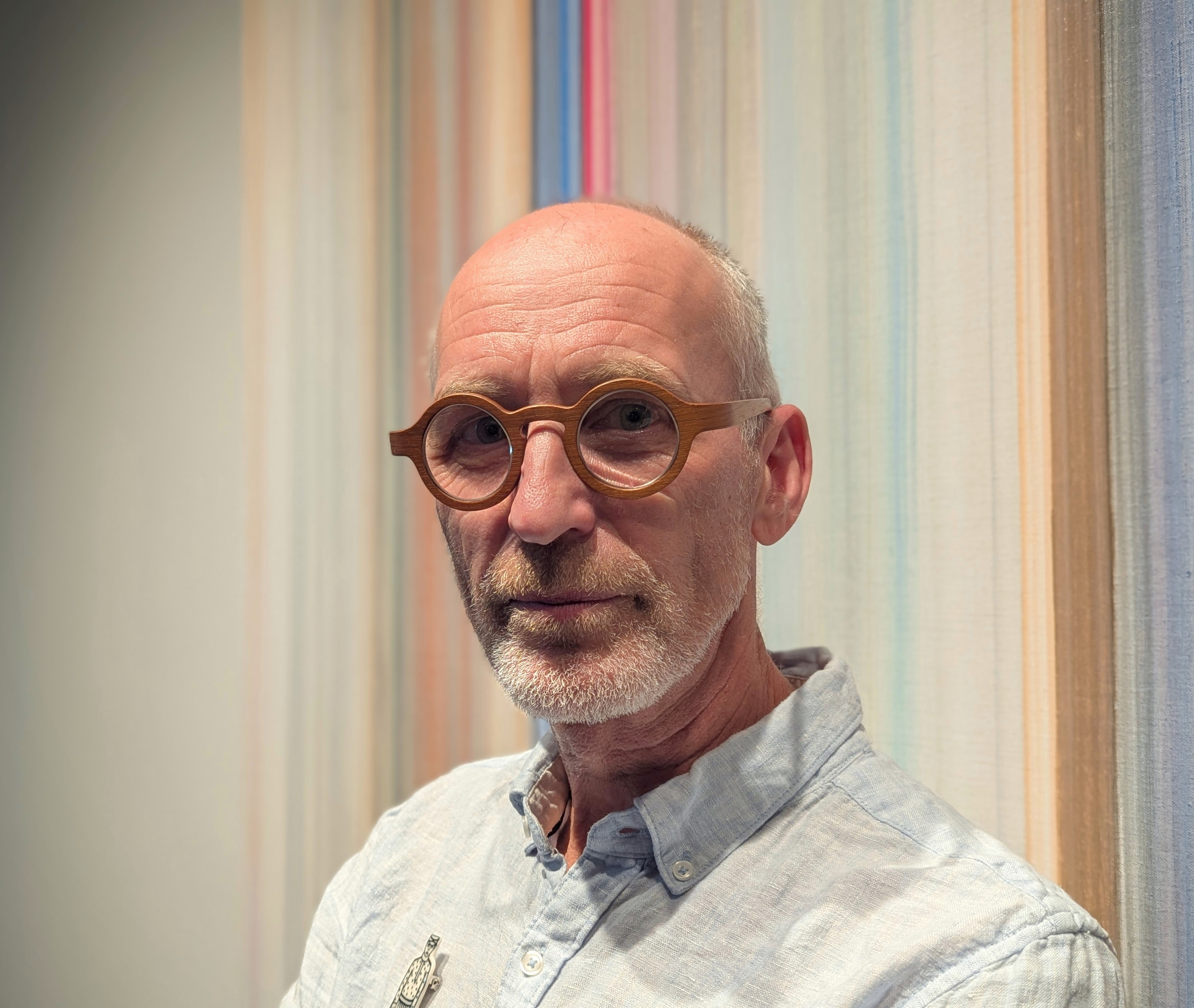
Isupov in 2025

Sergei Isupov (born August 17, 1963) is a ceramic artist born in Stavropol, Russia, now living in Cummington, Massachusetts, United States, and Tallinn, Estonia. He was educated at the Ukrainian State Art School in Kiev and went on to graduate in 1990 from the Art Institute of Tallinn in Estonia with Bachelor of Arts and Master of Fine Arts degrees in ceramic art. He has since exhibited widely in both solo and group exhibitions, received numerous awards, and widely collected by museums and private collectors.

Isupov's parents are both artists: his father, Vladimir, is a painter and his mother, Nelli, is a sculptor working in ceramics. His brother, Ilya, is a painter. Sergei emigrated to the United States in 1993.

== Solo exhibitions ==
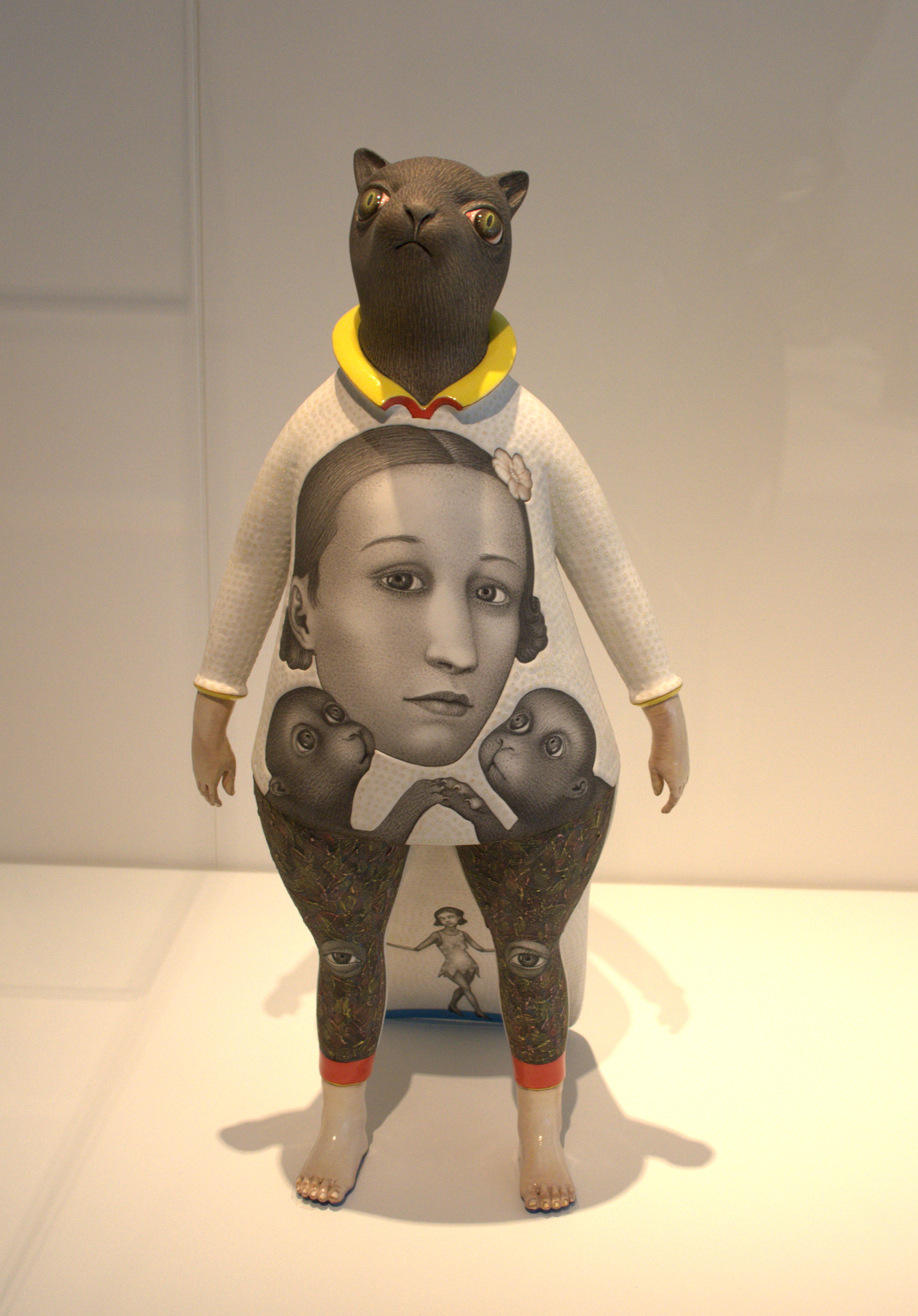
Lady Cat (2012), porcelain with slip and gaze

- 1993: Mosabaka Gallery, Helsinki, Finland
- 1993: Vasa Gallery, Falun, Sweden
- 1995: It all started with tea, Connell Gallery, Atlanta, Georgia, United States
- 1995:Marta Hewett Gallery, Cincinnati, Ohio, United States
- 2003: Ferrin Gallery, Lenox, Massachusetts
- 2007: Ferrin Gallery, Lenox and Pittsfield, Massachusetts
- 2008: Androgyny, Ferrin Gallery, Pittsfield, Massachusetts
- 2009: Androgyny: New Work by Sergei Isupov, Daum Museum of Contemporary Art, Sedalia, Missouri, United States
- 2009: Androgyny, Mesa Contemporary Arts Center, Mesa, Arizona, United States
- 2010: Firmly Standing, Estonian Museum of Applied Art and Design, Tallinn, Estonia
- 2010: He + She, Barry Friedman Ltd., New York, New York
- 2013: Call of the Wild, Barry Friedman Gallery Ltd., New York, New York
- 2013: Here and There, HOP Gallery, Tallinn, Estonia
- 2014: Collection Focus: Sergei Isupov, Racine Art Museum, Racine, Wisconsin
- 2014: Here and There, International Biennial of the Vallauris Institute, Hôtel de Ville, Vallauris, France
- 2014: Here and There, solo exhibition, HOP Gallery, Tallinn, Estonia
- 2014: New Work: Sergei Isupov, Perimeter Gallery, Chicago, Illinois
- 2014: Promenade, Perimeter Gallery, Chicago, Illinois
- 2014: Sergei Isupov, Ferrin Contemporary at Independent Art Projects, North Adams, Massachusetts
- 2015: Sergei Isupov, Kasher | Potamkin, New York, New York
- 2016: Head On, de Menil Gallery, Groton School, Groton, Massachusetts
- 2016: Sergei Isupov: Hidden Messages, Erie Art Museum, Erie, Pennsylvania
- 2016: FIREFEST, STARworks, Star, North Carolina
- 2017: Sergei Isupov: Selections from Hidden Messages, Ferrin Contemporary, North Adams, Massachusetts
- 2018: Directions: Sergei Isupov, Ferrin Contemporary, North Adams, Massachusetts
- 2019 SURREAL PROMENADE: Sergei Isupov, The Museum of Russian Art, Minneapolis, Minnesota
- 2022 SERGEI ISUPOV: Past & Present, Ferrin Contemporary, North Adams, Massachusetts
- 2022 Sergei Isupov: Proximal Duality, TurnPark Art Space, West Stockbridge, Massachusetts
- 2023 Sergei Isupov: Alliances, Thorne Sagendorph Gallery, Keene, New Hampshire
- 2024 Sergei Isupov: Ancestor, Anderson Gallery, Bridgewater State University, Bridgewater, Massachusetts
- 2025: Moments from Eternity, District Clay Center, Washington, DC

== Awards ==
- 1991: “Best Young Estonian Artist” (under age 30) by the Union of Artists of Estonia Prize of the Ministry of Culture of Estonia
- 1993: Director’s Scholarship, six-week residency, International Ceramics Center, Kecskemet, Hungary
- 1996: Smithsonian Craft Show Top Award for Excellence, Washington, DC
- 2001: Louis Comfort Tiffany Biennial Award

== Collections ==
- de Young Museum, San Francisco, California
- Fine Arts Museum of San Francisco, California
- Museum of Fine Arts Houston, Houston, Texas
- Mobile Museum of Art, Mobile, Alabama
- Tallinn Museum of Applied Art, Estonia
- Museum of Contemporary Ceramics, Summe, Ukraine
- Museum fur Angewandte, Kunst, Frankfurt, Germany
- Arizona State University (Art Museum), Tempe, Arizona
- Daum Museum of Contemporary Art, Sedalia, Missouri
- Sparta Teapot Museum, Sparta, North Carolina
- Arkansas Arts Center, Littlerock, Arkansas
- Carnegie Museum of Art, Pittsburgh, Pennsylvania
- Everson Museum of Art, Syracuse, New York
- Fuller Craft Museum, Brockton, Massachusetts
- Los Angeles County Museum of Art
- Mint Museum of Craft & Design, Charlotte, North Carolina
- Museum of Fine Arts, Boston, Massachusetts
- Racine Art Museum, Racine, WI
- Estonian Museum of Applied Art and Design, Estonia
- The Imperial Center for the Arts & Sciences, Rocky Mount, North Carolina
- Oslo Museum of Applied Art, Oslo, Norway
- National Gallery of Australia, Canberra, Australia
- Norwegian Museum of Art, Trondheim, Norway
- Museum of Arts & Design, New York, New York
- Museum of International Ceramics, Keckemet, Hungary
- Western Carolina University, Cullowhee, North Carolina
