= Cotton Free Library =

Public library in Weybridge, Vermont, US

- U.S. National Register of Historic Places
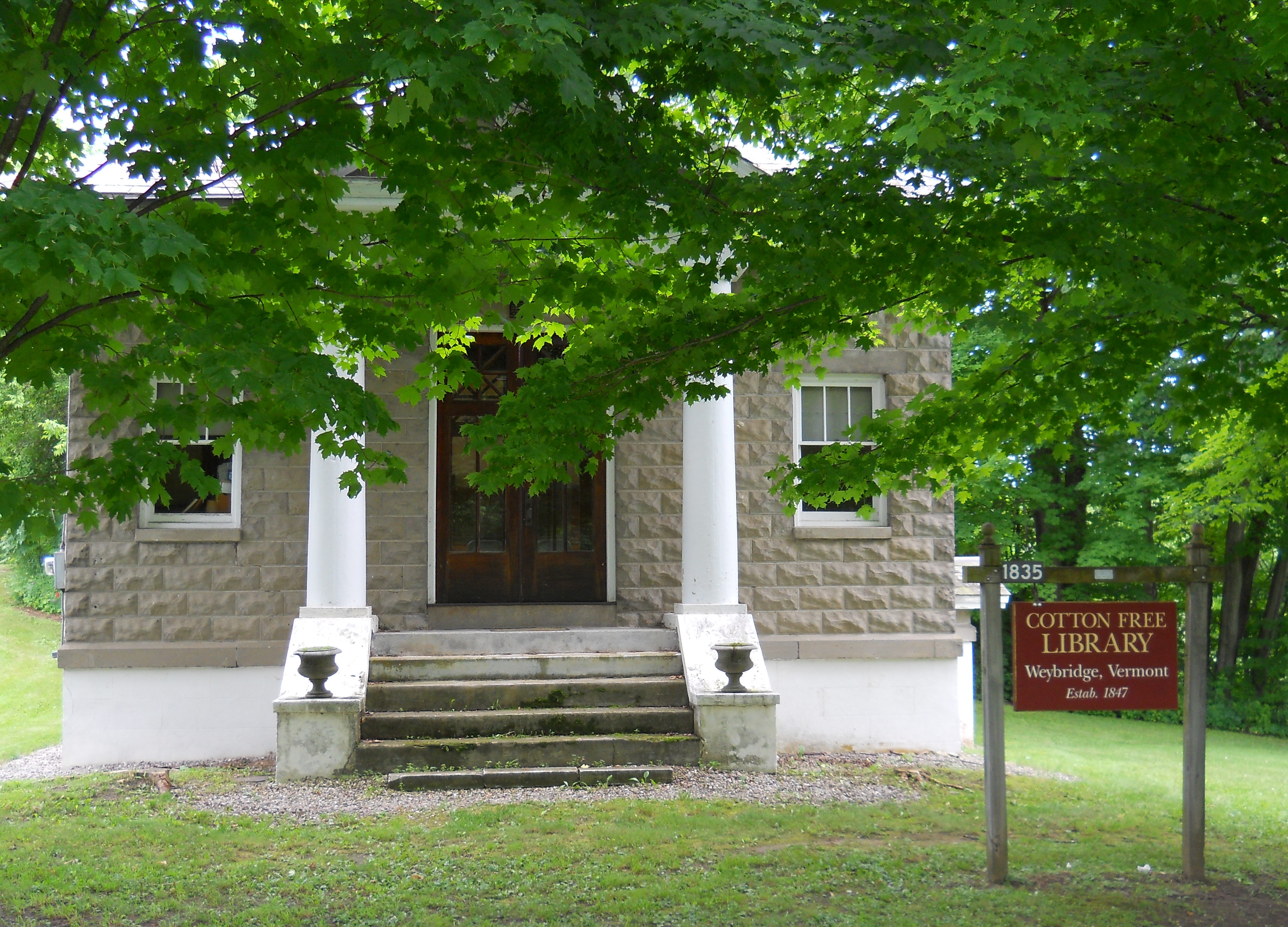

- Location within Vermont Location within the United States
- Location: Quaker Village Rd., Weybridge, Vermont
- Coordinates: 44°3′54″N 73°12′57″W
- Area: less than one acre
- Built: 1913
- Architectural style: Colonial Revival
- NRHP reference No.: 96000388
- Added to NRHP: April 4, 1996

The Cotton Free Library is the public library serving the town of Weybridge, Vermont. It is located on Quaker Village Road, in a small architecturally distinguished Colonial Revival building constructed in 1913 donated by Joshua Franklin Cotton. The building was listed on the National Register of Historic Places in 1996.

== Architecture and history ==
The Cotton Free Library is located in Weybridge's historic village center, just north of Weybridge Town Hall, with which it shares a lot. It is a small square structure, built out of rock-faced concrete blocks and covered by a hip roof. Its front facade is symmetrical with the centered entrance sheltered by a gabled portico supported by two Doric columns. The centered of the gable is adorned with a small oculus window. The interior's original features include a pressed tin ceiling, a swinging metal arm for holding an oil lamp, and a brass-plated tin chandelier with eight etched-glass globes, originally lit with kerosene but later electrified. The rear wall has a fireplace whose mantel is adorned with Arts and Crafts tiles.

The library was founded in 1897 by the town after receiving a bequest from Joshua Franklin Cotton, a local citizen. Originally located in the basement of the town hall, its growing collection prompted the decision to build a dedicated structure. Land for the building was acquired in 1913, and construction took place in 1914-16, with the building formally opened late in 1916. The library is one of the only buildings of its type in the state to be built using this type of concrete block. The building was electrified in 1922.

== See also ==
- National Register of Historic Places listings in Addison County, Vermont
