= William Cullen Bryant Homestead =

Historic house in Massachusetts, United States

- U.S. National Register of Historic Places
- U.S. National Historic Landmark
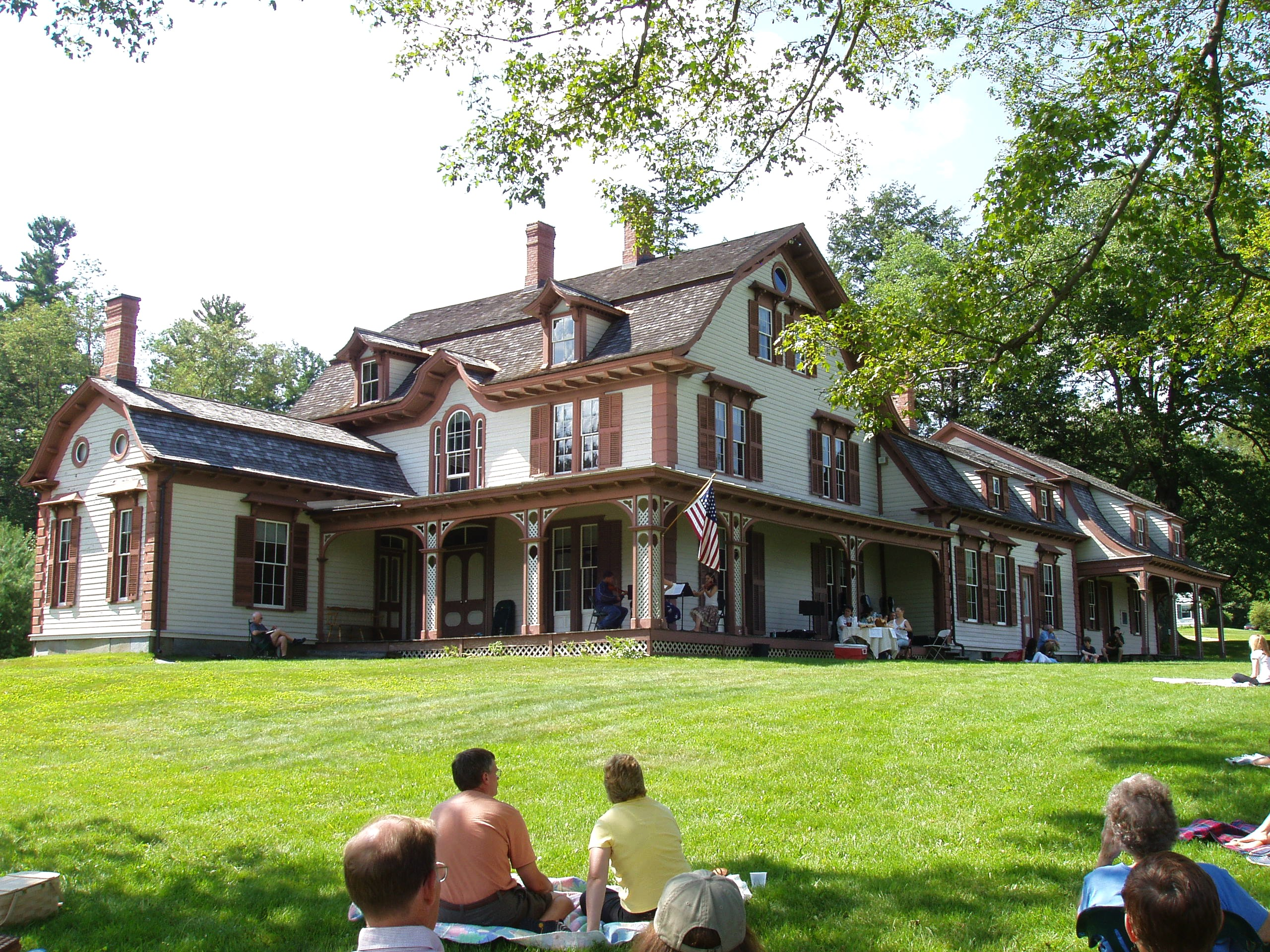
- A string quartet plays on the homestead's porch

- Location within Massachusetts Location within the United States
- Interactive map showing the location for William Cullen Bryant Homestead
- Nearest city: Cummington, Massachusetts
- Coordinates: 42°28′16.61″N 72°56′26″W
- Area: 188.57 acres (0.7631 km^{2})
- Built: 1783
- Architectural style: Late Victorian
- Website: William Cullen Bryant Homestead
- NRHP reference No.: 66000136

Significant dates
- Added to NRHP: October 15, 1966
- Designated NHL: December 29, 1962

The William Cullen Bryant Homestead is the boyhood home and later summer residence of William Cullen Bryant (1794–1878), one of America's foremost poets and newspaper editors. The 155-acre (63 ha) estate is located at 205 Bryant Road in Cummington, Massachusetts, overlooks the Westfield River Valley and is currently operated by the non-profit Trustees of Reservations. It is open to the public on weekends in summer and early fall for tours with an admission fee.

== History ==
The Homestead was originally built in 1783 by Bryant's grandfather, Ebenezer Snell. It is set on a hillside above the Westfield River valley with views of the Hampshire Hills. The early form of the house appears to have been a gambrel-roofed of 1.5 stories, with a single story ell attached to the rear. Bryant's father, Peter Bryant, purchased the property in 1799, and it is in this place that Bryant spent much of his childhood and early life. The future poet moved in at age four and remained there until he was 22.

Bryant briefly attended Williams College but called his education there "meager and slight" and left after only seven months, returning to the family Homestead in May 1811. After private study, he was admitted to the bar in 1815 and practiced law in nearby Plainfield, Massachusetts. He would walk seven miles from home to work every day. It was on one of these commutes, in December 1815, that he saw a single bird flying on the horizon and was inspired to write his poem "To a Waterfowl".

The property was sold out of the family in 1835. Bryant bought back the family home in 1865 and renovated it extensively. He had the original building raised up, and built a whole new first floor underneath it. He also had added to the building a replica of his father's office, and later added a major addition to the northwest side of the house. Bryant was also responsible for planting the property with fruit trees.

Several of Bryant's poems are inspired by his time in Cummington, particularly in the landscape that surrounded it, including "Lines on Revisiting the Country", "The Rivulet", and "Inscription for the Entrance to a Wood".

== Modern history ==
The property remained owned by members of the Bryant family until 1929, when it was donated by the poet's granddaughter to The Trustees of Reservations. The Homestead was designated a National Historic Landmark in 1962. The house is filled with furnishings and mementos from three generations of the Bryant family including exotic travel memorabilia from Europe and the Middle East and artifacts relating to rural life.

The surrounding landscape has changed little since the early 1800s and includes a stand of old-growth forest, a grove of 150-foot (46 m) pine trees, and nearly 200-year-old sugar maple trees. Included in the property are a visitor center, gift shop, barn, picnic areas, and two and a half miles of trails and roads.

Annually, about 7,000 people visit the site.

== Gallery ==
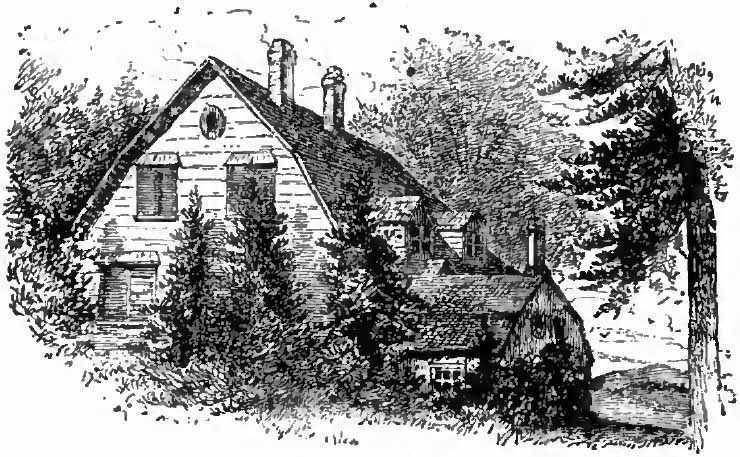
1900 drawing of the house

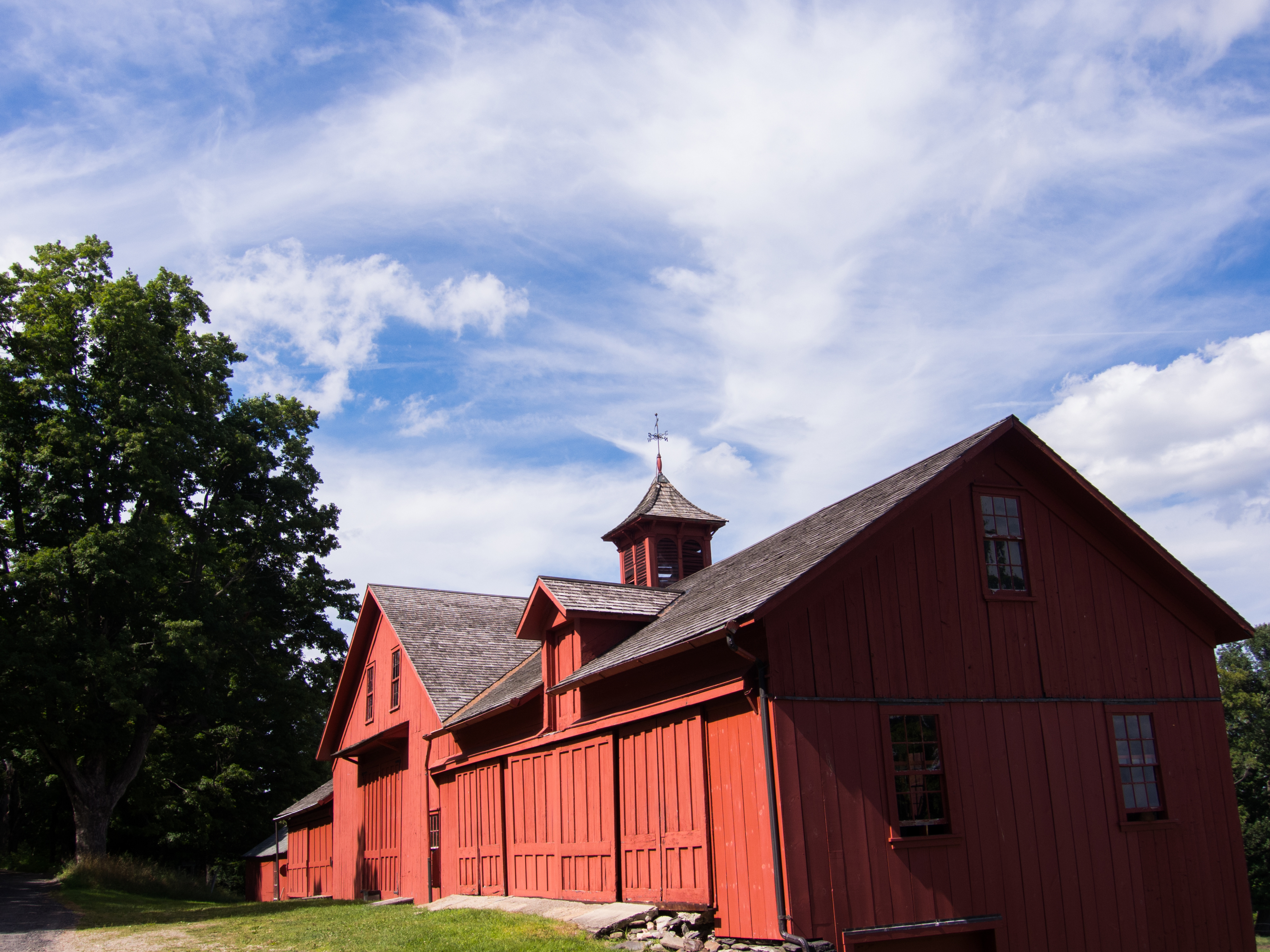
Bryant Barn

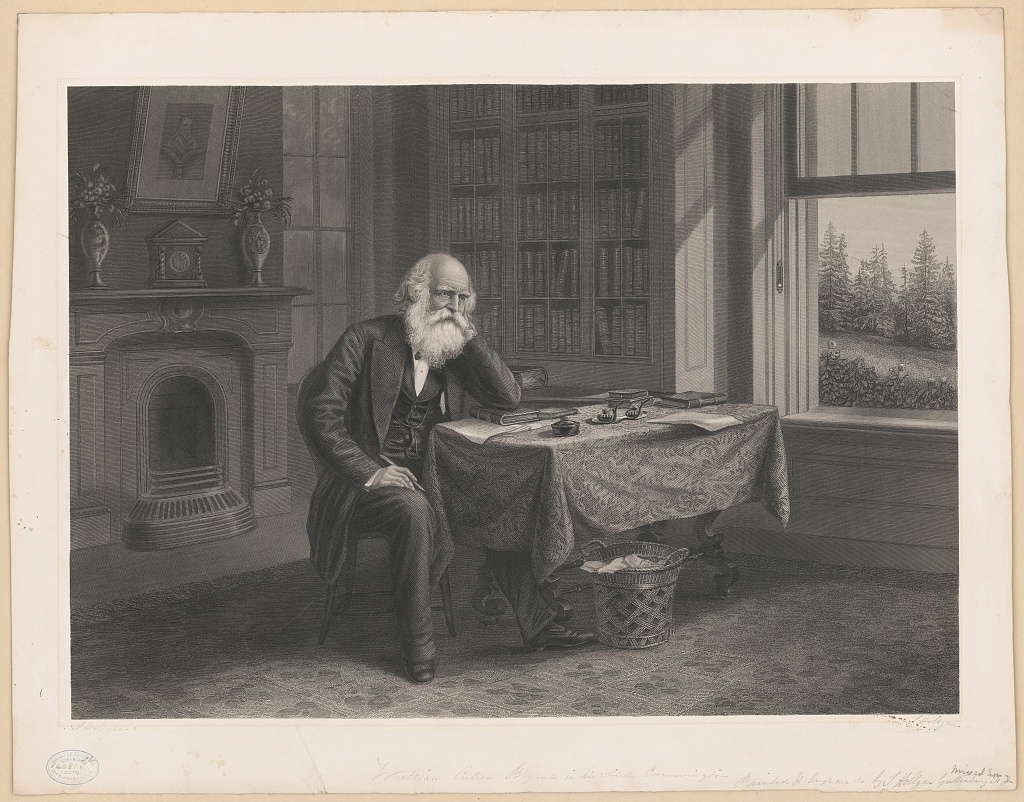
Bryant in his study at the homestead

== See also ==
- Cedarmere-Clayton Estates, includes Bryant's home in Roslyn Harbor, New York
- List of historic houses in Massachusetts
- National Register of Historic Places listings in Hampshire County, Massachusetts
- List of National Historic Landmarks in Massachusetts
