= Museum of Estonian Architecture =

Museum in Tallinn, Estonia

Estonian Museum of Architecture
- Eesti Arhitektuurimuuseum
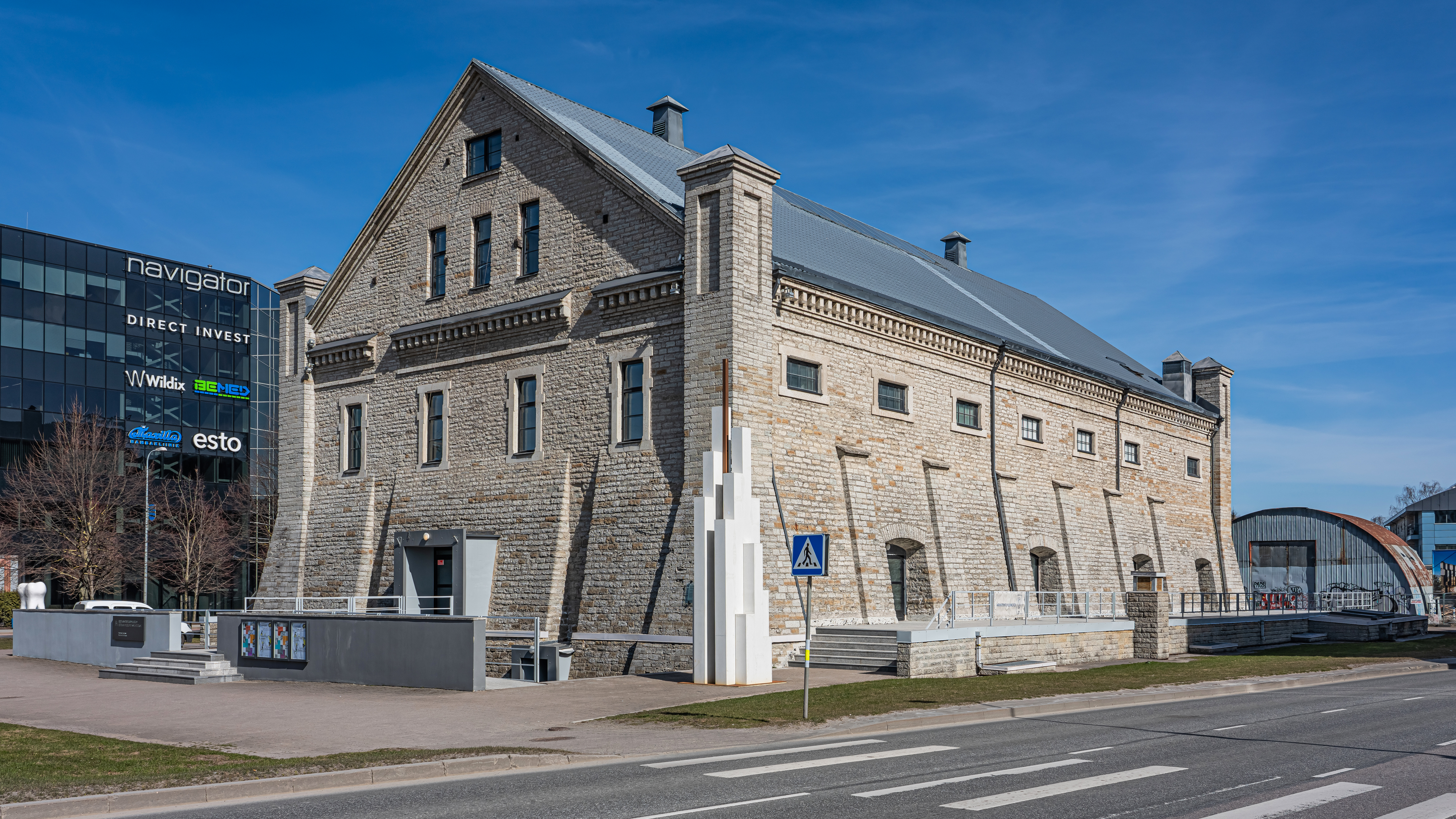
- Exterior view of the museum
- Established: January 1, 1991
- Location: Ahtri 2, Tallinn, Estonia
- Coordinates: 59.440369°N 24.756478°E
- Type: Architecture museum
- Visitors: 27,839 (2013)
- Director: Triin Ojari
- Website: www.arhitektuurimuuseum.ee/en/

Estonian Museum of Architecture (Estonian: Eesti Arhitektuurimuuseum) is an architecture museum in Tallinn, Estonia. It is located in the Rotermann quarter. The museum is a member of ICAM.

== History ==
The museum was established on 1 January 1991 to document, preserve, and inform visitors of the history of Estonian architecture and its development today. The museum began operating in a temporary space at Kooli 7 in Tallinn's Old Town, where the collections were located in the medieval Loewenschede Tower. In 1996, the museum moved to the Rotermann Salt Storage. The building was opened to the public on June 7, 1996.

== Building ==
The arched cellar of the building, which was completed according to a project drafted by Baltic-German engineer Ernst Boustedt in 1908, was space for salt storage. The Salt Storage was reconstructed in 1995–1996 according to a project by architect Ülo Peil and interior architect Taso Mähar (both from the architecture bureau Urbel & Peil). During the course of this reconstruction, the structure – which was originally a single storey – was divided into multiple floors with an intermediary ceiling and galleries in order to thus offer a greater number of exhibition spaces possessing different characters.

== Collections ==
The collections of the museum are categorized into archive, photo, model, furniture and art collections. There are approximately 11500 items in the Archive Collection along with city plans, building projects, architectural drawings, photographs, and manuscripts. The Photo Collection has almost 18000 items (photographs and negatives). Over 200 items (construction models of different architectures) are exhibited in the Model Collection of the museum.Furniture and Art collections also contains items associated with architects, like pieces of furniture, drawings, paintings and graphics designed by architects.

== See also ==
- Estonian Museum of Natural History
- Estonian Museum of Applied Art and Design
