= Weybridge Town Hall =

Historic church in Vermont, United States

- Wesleyan Methodist Church
- U.S. National Register of Historic Places
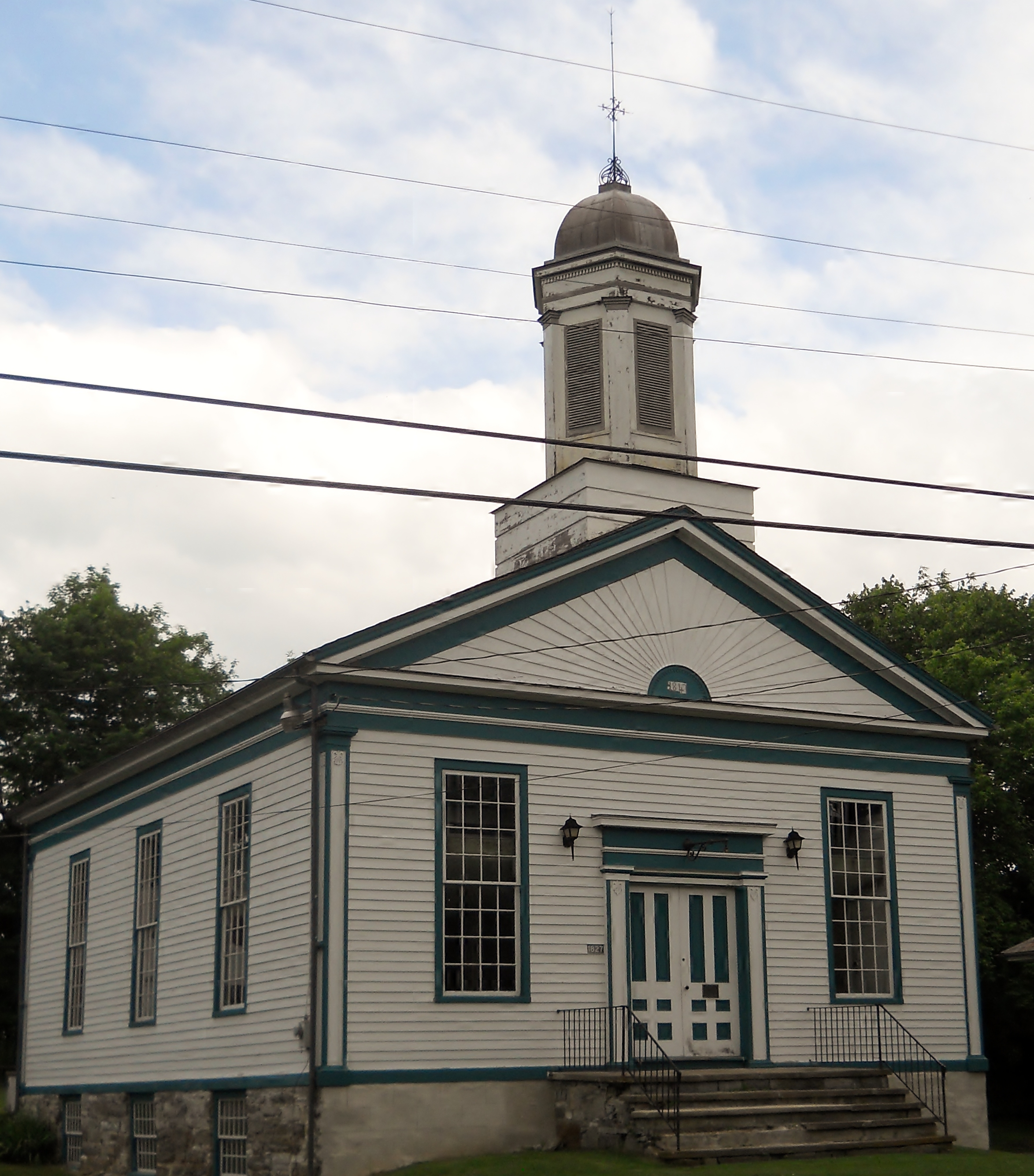

- Location within Vermont Location within the United States
- Location: Quaker Village Rd., near Jct. with Baker Ct., Weybridge, Vermont
- Coordinates: 44°3′53″N 73°12′57″W
- Area: less than one acre
- Built: 1847
- Architectural style: Greek Revival
- NRHP reference No.: 96000387
- Added to NRHP: April 12, 1996

Weybridge Town Hall is located on Quaker Village Road in northern Weybridge, Vermont. It was built in 1847, originally serving as the Wesleyan Methodist Church before becoming the town's first and only town hall in 1893. A fine example of Greek Revival architecture, it was listed on the National Register of Historic Places in 1996.

== Description and history ==
Weybridge Town Hall stands on the west side of Quaker Village Road in a dispersed village setting in northern Weybridge, arrayed mainly on the east bank of Otter Creek. It is a single-story wood-frame structure with a gabled roof and clapboarded exterior. The roof is capped by a tower that rises from a low flushboarded square base to a six-sided louvered belfry to an ogee-shaped dome. The main facade has paneled corner pilasters rising to an entablature and a fully pedimented gable with sunburst planking. The interior retains significant Greek Revival woodwork, as well as original bench pews and early 20th-century light fixtures.

The building was built in 1847 following the split of the local Methodist congregation over the matter of slavery. The abolitionist faction had withdrawn from the original congregation established in 1798, and built this church. Its builders clearly drew inspiration from the published works of Asher Benjamin: a number of its exterior and interior details are clearly drawn from plates in his pattern books. The Methodist congregations reunited after the American Civil War, but declined in size, and in 1893 leased the building to the town for use as its town hall. It is the town's first town hall, and continues to serve in that capacity, in addition to hosting community events. The building originally housed the town's library in its basement, until 1911 when the adjacent Cotton Free Library was built. The building underwent significant restoration in the 1990s.

== See also ==
- National Register of Historic Places listings in Addison County, Vermont
