= Sylvia Drake =

American tailor (1784–1868)

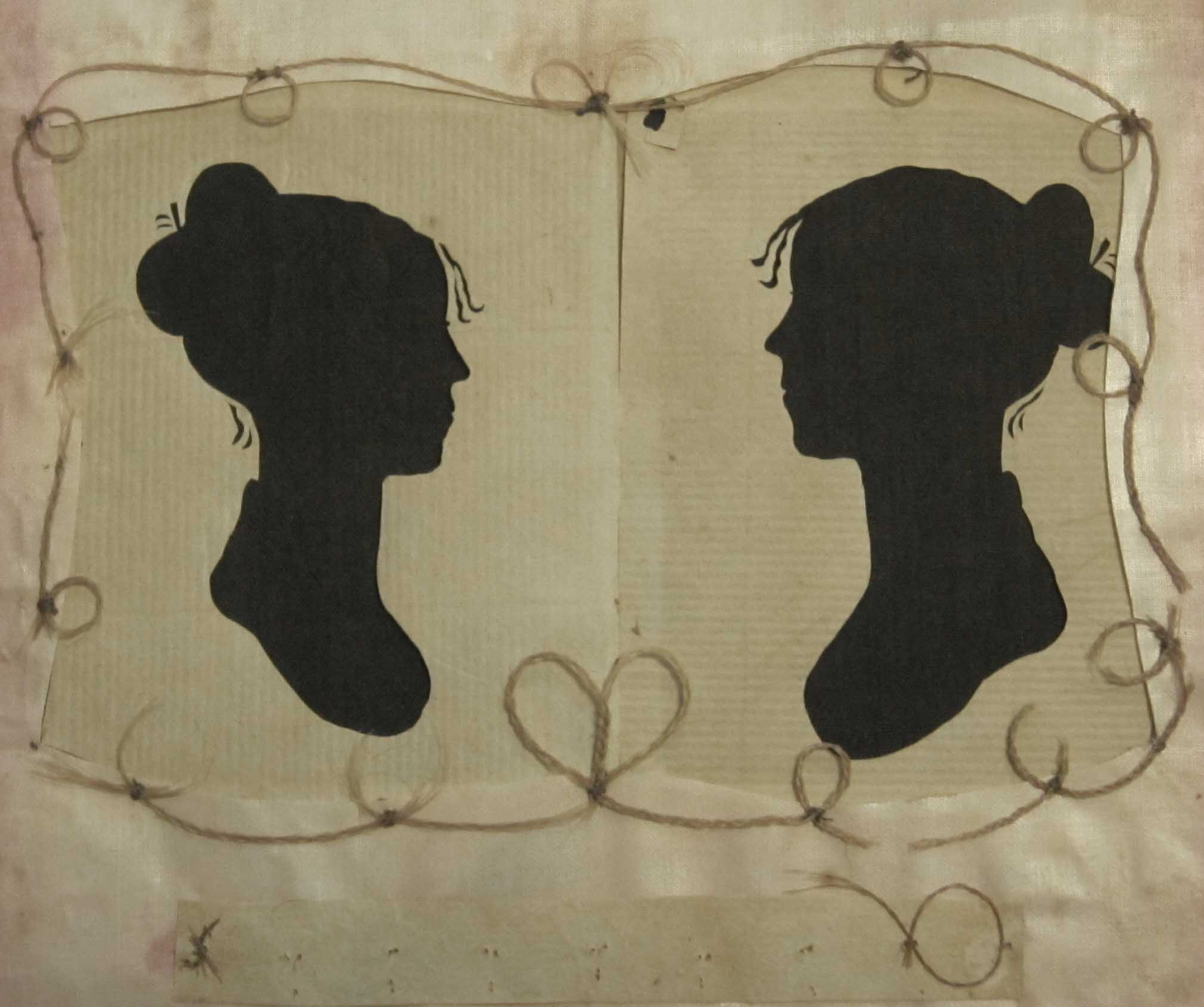
- Silhouettes of Drake and Charity Bryant
- Born: October 31, 1784; Easton, Massachusetts
- Died: February 13, 1868 (aged 83); Weybridge, Vermont
- Burial place: Weybridge Hill, Weybridge Vermont; 44°02′26″N 73°12′48″W
- Occupation: Tailor
- Partner: Charity Bryant (1807–1851)
- Parents: Thomas Drake II (father); Mary Drake (née Manley) (mother)

Sylvia Drake (October 31, 1784 – February 13, 1868) was an American tailor and the long-term partner of Charity Bryant. The relationship between the two women was extensively documented through business papers, letters, and diary entries, and it has helped shed light on the realities of same-sex relationships in the nineteenth century.

== Biography ==
Drake was born on October 31, 1784, in Easton, Massachusetts, to Mary Drake (née Manley) and Thomas Drake II. She was the youngest of eight children. Although the Drake family had weathered the Revolutionary War in relative safety, the economic crisis that followed impacted them particularly hard and they were bankrupt by 1788. The family was separated for much of the next ten years as they searched for work until Drake’s older brother, Asaph, established a household in Weybridge, Vermont. Drake’s father died on the journey in January 1798, but in 1799, Drake and her mother settled in Weybridge.

As a teenager, Drake was visited by a number of young men "paying their respect" to her, but she did not express interest in any of them. In February 1807, Drake met Charity Bryant, a friend of her older sister who had recently arrived in Weybridge. In July of the same year, Drake moved into Bryant's rented home there and, as she later wrote in her diary, "commenced serving in company with Dear Miss B."

In January 1809, the two women moved into a house of their very own out of which they ran their tailor shop. They were well-known members of their town, and in the spring of 1822, many members of the community assisted with major renovations to their house. Indeed, to the people of Weybridge, there was generally little publicly expressed concern about the women's relationship. When it came to tax documents and census records, Bryant was listed as the head of the household, and the people who knew them often spoke of them in terms generally used to discuss marriage. In the words of Bryant’s nephew, the poet William Cullen Bryant:

If I were permitted to draw the veil of private life, I would briefly give you the singular, and to me interesting, story of two maiden ladies who dwell in this valley. I would tell you how, in their youthful days, they took each other as companions for life, and how this union, no less sacred to them than the tie of marriage, has subsisted, in uninterrupted harmony, for more than forty years.

Not everyone was so amiable, though; Drake’s mother and some of her brothers did not visit often, but ultimately "the family compromised its embargo to preserve ... amity".

Both Bryant and Drake frequently suffered from poor health. Drake, in particular, was prone to severe migraines. Over the years, they turned to a variety of treatments for their ailments, often exploring both chemical and natural remedies, which gave them the medical knowledge to assist friends and family when necessary. Bryant's ill-health ultimately caught up with her, and she died of a heart attack on October 6, 1851.

Following Bryant's death, Drake was occupied with both running their business on her own, as well as managing the house that Bryant had left her. In 1859, she moved out of her home to live with and care for her elderly brother, Asaph. Drake was eighty-three years old when she died on February 13, 1868. She was buried in the same plot as Bryant on Weybridge Hill and in the summer of 1868, a joint headstone with both of their names was erected at the site.
