= Katherine Frazier =

American arts administrator

- Born: January 28, 1882; Slingerlands, New York
- Died: 1944 (aged 61–62); Cummington, Massachusetts
- Other names: Katharine Frazier
- Occupation(s): Musician, educator, arts administrator
- Relatives: John I. Slingerland (great-uncle)

Katherine Maria Frazier (January 28, 1882 – 1944), also seen as Katharine Frazier, was an American musician and arts administrator. In 1923 she opened a theatre in Cummington, Massachusetts, which in 1927 became part of Frazier's Cummington School of the Arts, offering summer residencies, camps, and a performance venue for visual artists, musicians, and writers.

== Early life and education ==
Frazier was born in Slingerlands, New York, and raised in Amsterdam, New York, the daughter of Leonard A. Frazier and Catharine A. Slingerland Frazier. Her father was a physician. Her mother's uncle was abolitionist Congressman John I. Slingerland. She graduated from Mount Holyoke College in 1902. She studied music in Paris in 1908 and 1909.

== Career ==
=== Music ===
Frazier was a concert harpist, a member of the Carlos Salzedo Harp Ensemble, and director of the Trio Eleu, the Smith College Harp Ensemble and the Phaneian Harp Ensemble. She was also a pianist and organist. She worked at Smith College, as head of the harp and piano programs. She was assistant to editor Carlos Salzedo at the Eolian Review, and general secretary of the National Association of Harpists.

=== Cummington School and Cummington Press ===
In 1923 Frazier opened The Music Box, also known as Playhouse-in-the-Hills, in Cummington, Massachusetts, which became part of Frazier's progressive Cummington School of the Arts. She intended to provide a pastoral setting and minimal distractions for summer residencies, classes, camps, and a performance venue for visual artists, musicians, and writers including Diane Arbus, Amy Clampitt, Chaim Gross, Willem de Kooning, Helen Frankenthaler, and Marianne Moore.

Frazier and Harry Duncan were directors of the Cummington Press, a small but influential press that published works by William Carlos Williams, Robert Lowell, Wallace Stevens, and other poets. In the early 1940s, she sold her concert harp to fund new equipment for the press.

== Publications ==
- "Aim IX" (1921)
- "The Esthetic and the Exact" (1922, with Vera Gushee)

== Personal life and legacy ==
Frazier died from cancer in 1944, at the age of 62, in Cummington. There was a memorial chamber music concert at the Playhouse-in-the-Hills after her death.

The records of the Cummington School of the Arts from Frazier's years are in special collections at University of Massachusetts Amherst. There are also papers related to Frazier in the Cummington Press records at Emory University. The Cummington Community of the Arts program closed in 1993, and Cummington Press moved to Iowa in 1956 before it closed in 1997; but the Community House still stands and offers art exhibits and other cultural events. There is a Frazier Lane in Cummington.
