= Greenwood Music Camp =

Summer camp in Massachusetts, United States

Coordinates: 42.467008°N 72.880222°W

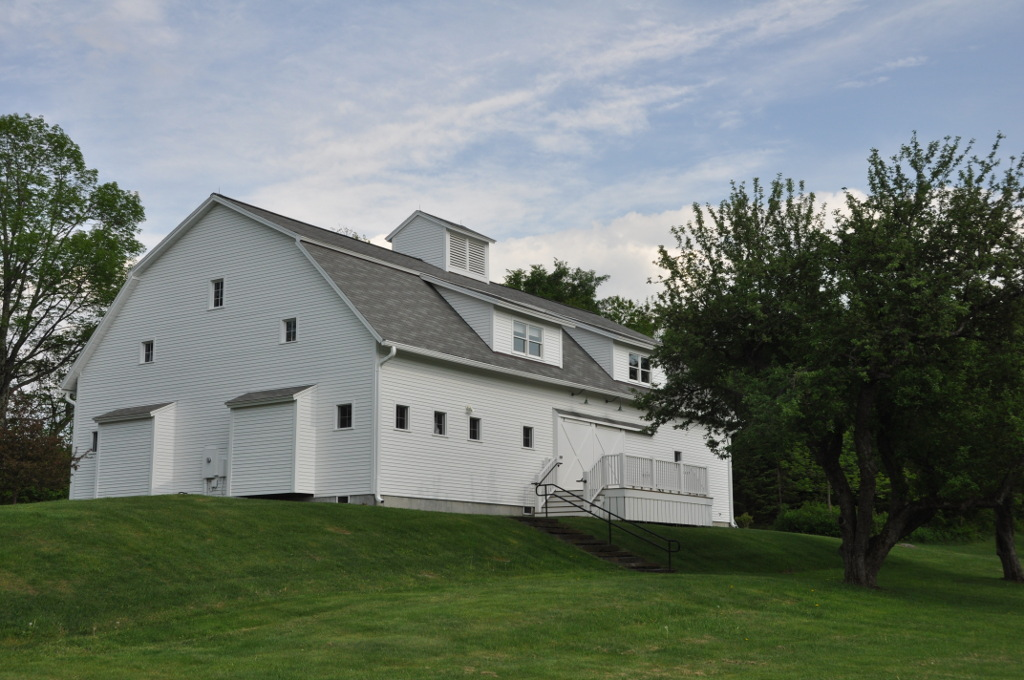
The performance barn at Greenwood

Greenwood Music Camp is a summer camp in Cummington, Massachusetts whose primary focus is chamber music. Other activities include soccer, crackabout, softball, capture the flag, a treasure hunt, charades, talent show, hikes up Mount Greylock, visits to art museums, a contra dance and a visit to the Cummington Fair, as well as sports swimming, tennis or ping-pong.

Greenwood was founded in 1933 by Dorothy "Bunny" Fay Little and Ruth Hill McGregor, and moved to its current location in 1940. The senior session (up to age 18) is five weeks starting July, and the junior session (up to age 13) is two weeks in August.

== History ==
Greenwood Music Camp was founded in 1933 by Dorothy "Bunny" Fay Little and Ruth Hill McGregor.

In a 1982 essay, Dwight Little wrote:

Greenwood really started by chance. Bunny (Fay) and Ruth (Hill) had taught at the Smith College Summer School of Music after graduating, but in 1933 Rumsey McGregor (engaged to Ruth) said, "Why don't you and Bunny take a few of your students to Isle La Motte"—Ruth's parents' summer home on Lake Champlain—"for a month this summer?" Ruth thought it was a great idea, wrote to Bunny, and had a reply (positive) by return mail.

That first year, in 1933, there were five students, and Ruth's parents, Dr. and Mrs. Hill, enthusiastically made way for them ... The name Greenwood had been given to the Hill's summer place by Ruth's younger brother who loved Robin Hood. He shot home-made arrows up and down the hill when he was a boy.

When the camp grew to ten students, Dwight and Bunny moved it to Harvard, Massachusetts, to a large house with a warren of rooms and studies—known as the Hutch—on the side of a hill. The move to the Berkshires, to a beautiful hilltop location, made it possible to house more than 40 campers plus faculty.

The camp and its music teaching methods have been featured on the Classical Connections show on Boston's WGBH (FM).

== Notable alumni ==
- Alan Gilbert
- Gilbert Kalish
- Joel Krosnick
- Anton Kuerti
- Julian Kuerti
- Kenji Lopez-Alt
- Charles Neidich
- Peter G. Neumann
- Andy Stein
- Mark Steinberg
- Mark Wood
- James Yannatos
