= Charity Bryant =

American poet (1777–1851)

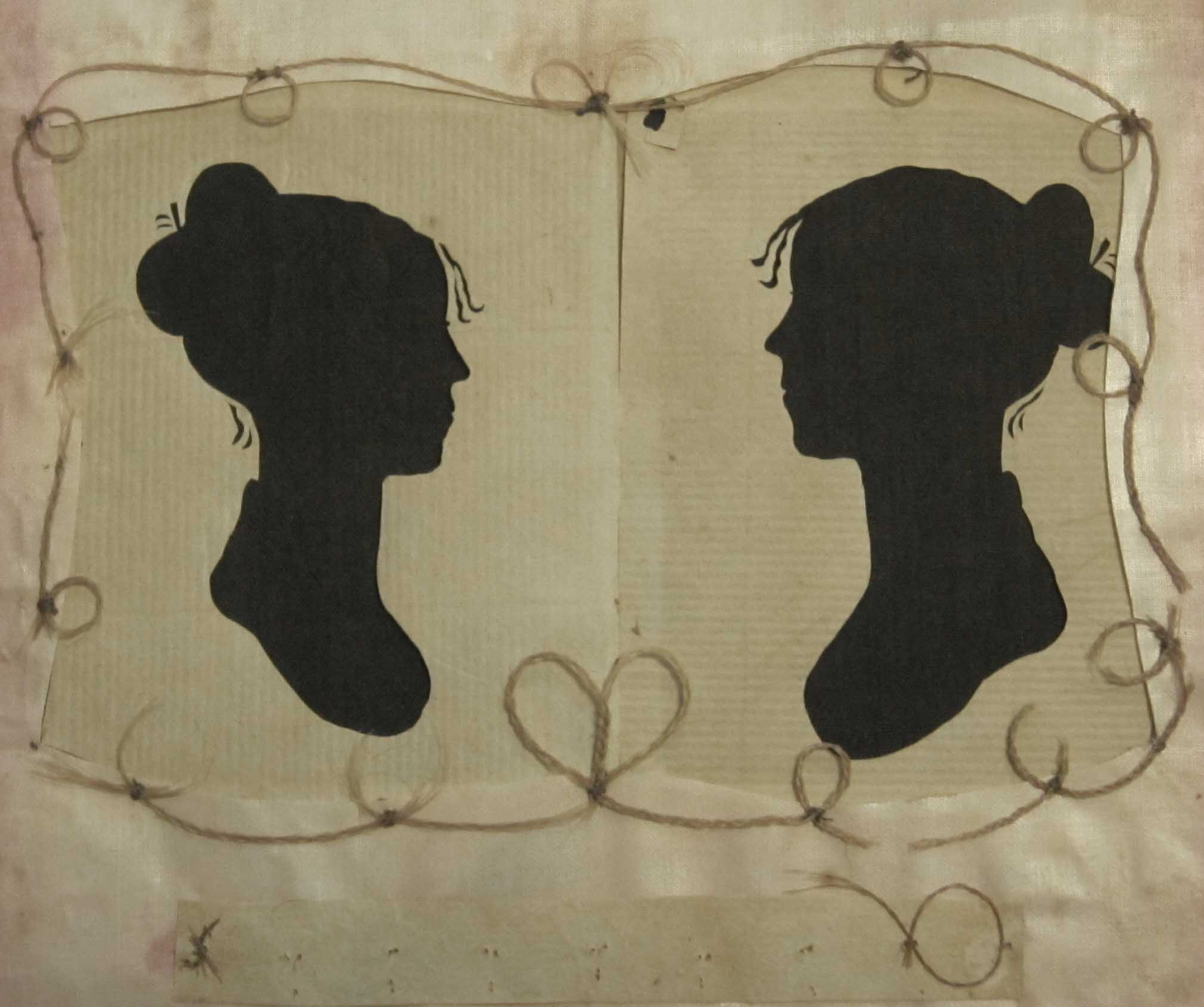
- Silhouette portrait of Bryant and Sylvia Drake
- Born: Charity Bryant; May 22, 1777; North Bridgewater, Massachusetts, U.S.
- Died: October 6, 1851 (aged 74)
- Resting place: Weybridge Hill Cemetery, Addison County, Vermont
- Occupations: Business owner, diarist
- Partner: Sylvia Drake
- Writing career
- Genres: diary; acrostic poet

Charity Bryant (May 22, 1777 – October 6, 1851) was an American business owner and writer. She was a diarist and wrote acrostic poetry. Because there is extensive documentation for the shared lives of Bryant and her partner Sylvia Drake, their diaries, letters and business papers have become an important part of the archive in documenting the history of same-sex couples.

== Biography ==
Charity Bryant was born on May 22, 1777, in North Bridgewater, Massachusetts to Silence (née Howard) and Phillip Bryant. Her mother died of consumption shortly after her birth. Charity did not know much about her mother, though she wrote many intimate poems of their relationship. The first poem she wrote about her mother, she used words like “tender”, used from her sister’s own point of view.

An excerpt from this poem is as follows:

... And say, was I wrong for to dream
That fortune upon me would shine?
When friends to me smiling did seem
And the tend'rest of Mothers was mine...

She was the sister of Peter Bryant, a doctor and later a state legislator, and the aunt of poet William Cullen Bryant. She was a descendant of Francis Cooke through her father's line. As the youngest of at least ten surviving children (including an oldest brother, Oliver, who had enlisted in the Massachusetts militia and died sometime in August of 1776), Bryant was often treated with "affectionate indulgence" by her older siblings, who also instilled in her a love for poetry that would stay with her throughout her life.

== Early life ==
Charity was named after her mother's sister, Charity Howard, who was also an unmarried woman throughout her life. Charity had a caretaker, Grace Hayward, who raised her from infancy for about two years until her father remarried. Grace stayed in her life when Charity would become ill and when her stepmother did not want to care for her and her siblings. Charity would later say Grace was like an "ever-kind mother" to her.

== Career ==
Bryant began working as a teacher in 1797 in Dartmouth, Massachusetts, which allowed her the opportunity to live independently from her father and stepmother, earn her own living, and still protect her reputation. During this time, she formed intimate relationships with several of her fellow teachers, including most notably Lydia Richards, with whom Bryant exchanged a number of poems containing somewhat erotic imagery.

In 1807, she went to visit a friend, Polly Hayward in Weybridge, Vermont and it was there that she was introduced to Polly's sister, Sylvia Drake. (Note: Washington states that "They came to Weybridge in 1806 from eastern Massachusetts...") The two quickly became partners and worked together in a tailoring business that they ran out of their shared house. Their community, including their relatives, accepted them as a married couple after many years of consistency and courage from both Charity and Sylvia.

Drake discussed their relationship in her diaries:

Tuesday- 3 [July]—31 years since I left my mother’s house and commenced serving in company with Dear Miss B. Sin mars all earthly bliss, and no common sinner have I been, but God has spared my life, given me every thing I would enjoy and now I have a space, if I improve it, to exercise true penitence.

Bryant’s nephew, William Cullen Bryant, also described their relationship using language that emphasized the depth of the women's relationship:

If I were permitted to draw the veil of private life, I would briefly give you the singular, and to me interesting, story of two maiden ladies who dwell in this valley. I would tell you how, in their youthful days, they took each other as companions for life, and how this union, no less sacred to them than the tie of marriage, has subsisted, in uninterrupted harmony, for more than forty years.

Charity and Sylvia’s relationship was treated the same way as a typical marriage between a man and a woman: according to William Cullen Bryant, Bryant was like the "husband", and Drake was her "fond wife". On tax documents and census records, Bryant was always noted as the head of the household. Charity and Sylvia were also active members in their community, with Charity being a highly trusted tailor in the fashion business and Sylvia working as a seamstress and teaching Sunday school for children.

== Acrostic poetry ==
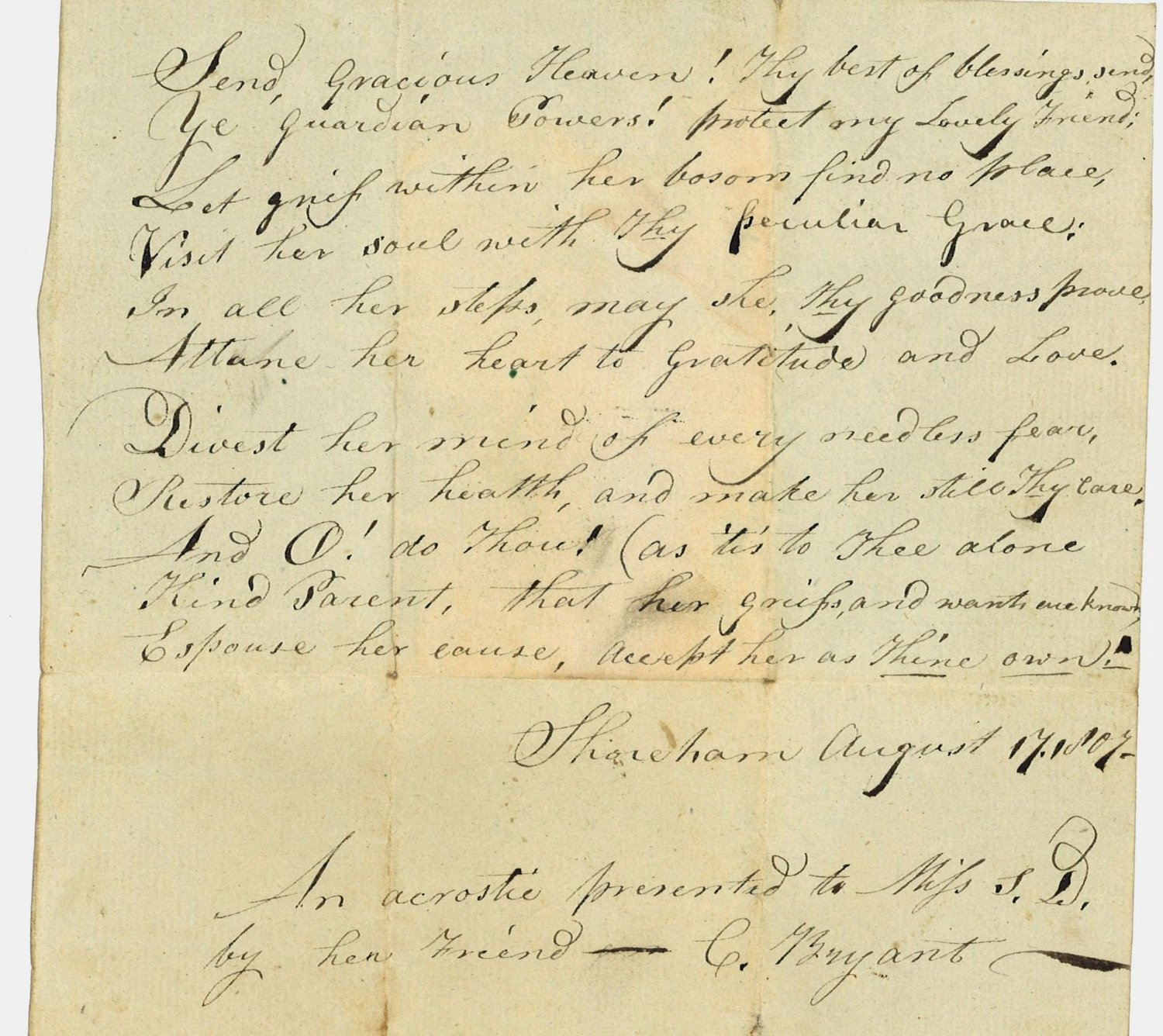
Acrostic poem Bryant wrote to Sylvia Drake

Acrostic poetry is defined by a poem where each beginning letter of every line spells out a word or message. Charity wrote many poems throughout her lifetime, which she later ordered to be burned after her death, but the few that remain are mostly written to Sylvia, expressing love and the need to protect her always. Charity would have the poems directed to or for Sylvia spell "Sylvia Drake" with each beginning letter of every line.

Bryant had suffered from poor health since infancy, and her adult years were also plagued with illness. In the summer of 1839, she developed heart disease that would ultimately kill her on October 6, 1851. In her will, Bryant left their shared home entirely to Drake who lived there until 1859.

Bryant and Drake are buried together under a shared headstone at Weybridge Hill Cemetery, Addison County, Vermont.
