= Estonian Museum of Natural History =

Museum in Tallinn

Coordinates: 59.4409°N 24.7452°E

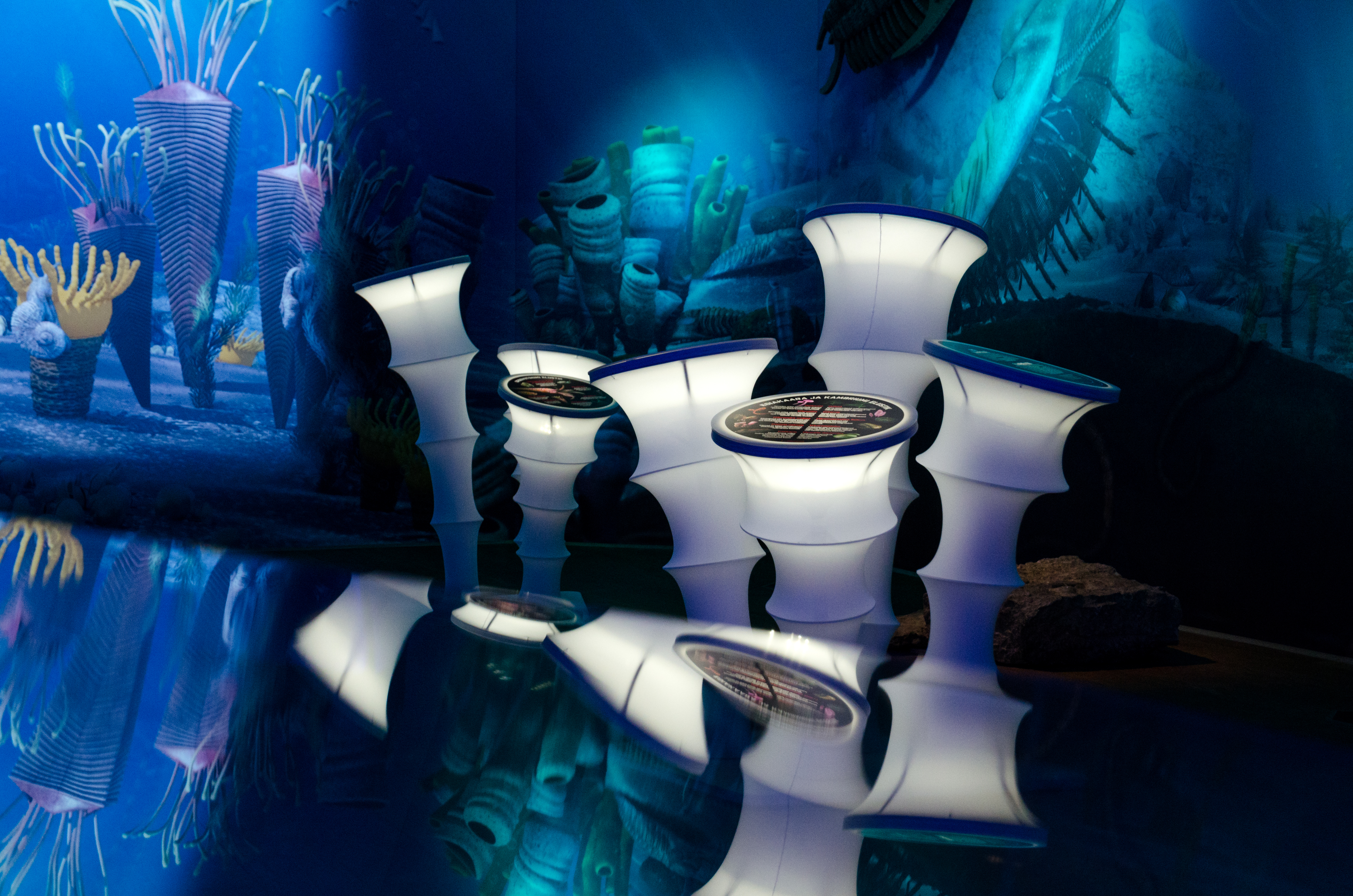
- Exhibition "The Secrets of Ancient Sea" in Estonian Museum of Natural History

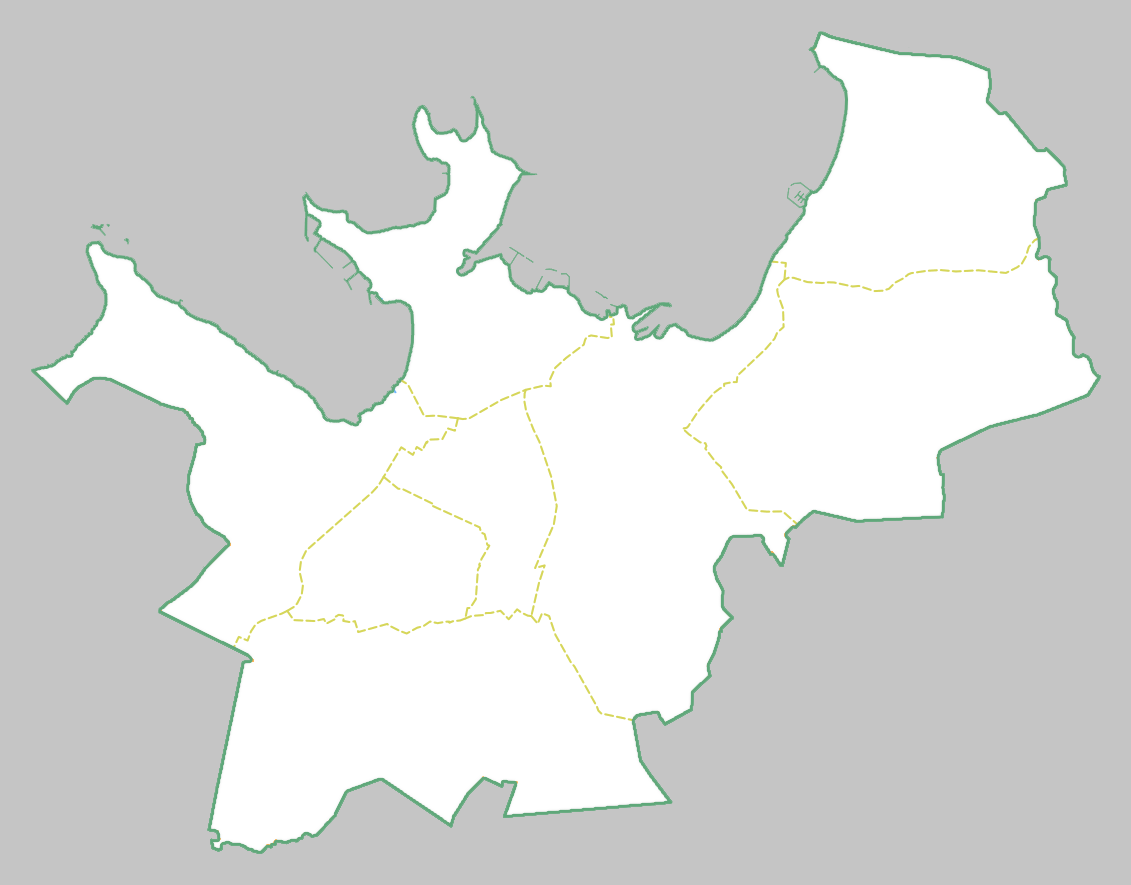
- Location within Tallinn
- Former name: The National Museum of Natural History
- Established: 1941
- Location: Tallinn, Estonia
- Type: Natural history museum
- Website: https://www.loodusmuuseum.ee/

The Estonian Museum of Natural History (EMNH; Estonian: Eesti Loodusmuuseum) is the Estonian national museum of natural history. It is situated in Tallinn's Old Town.

The museum focuses on natural history and nature education, offering its visitors a tour in the wilderness of Estonia.

== History ==
The origins of the museum goes back to the Estonian Literary Society's museum founded in 1842 and renamed to the Provincial Museum in 1864. This museum was active in exploring the natural sciences, an area that increased in significance at the museum in 1872 when Alexander von der Pahlen (1820–1895) began to contribute to the collection. Pahlen was later elected chairman and under his leadership the collection continued to grow. As the collection grew, a new building on Kohtu Street was purchased in 1911 to house it.

During World War I, due to passive resistance, the museum's collection were not moved to Russia. The Provincial Museum continued to operate under the Arts and Heritage Department of the Minister of Education and Research but changed its name to the Museum of the Estonian Literary Society in 1926.

After the Molotov–Ribbentrop Pact, Baltic-German institutions, including the Estonian Literary Society, were closed. In 1940, through the Regulation of the Council of People’s Commissars of the Estonian SSR, the Soviet authorities nationalized all museums allowing for a National Museum of Natural History to be established in Tallinn on January 1, 1941. In 1942, a bomb destroyed a portion of the museum's specimens.

== Collection ==
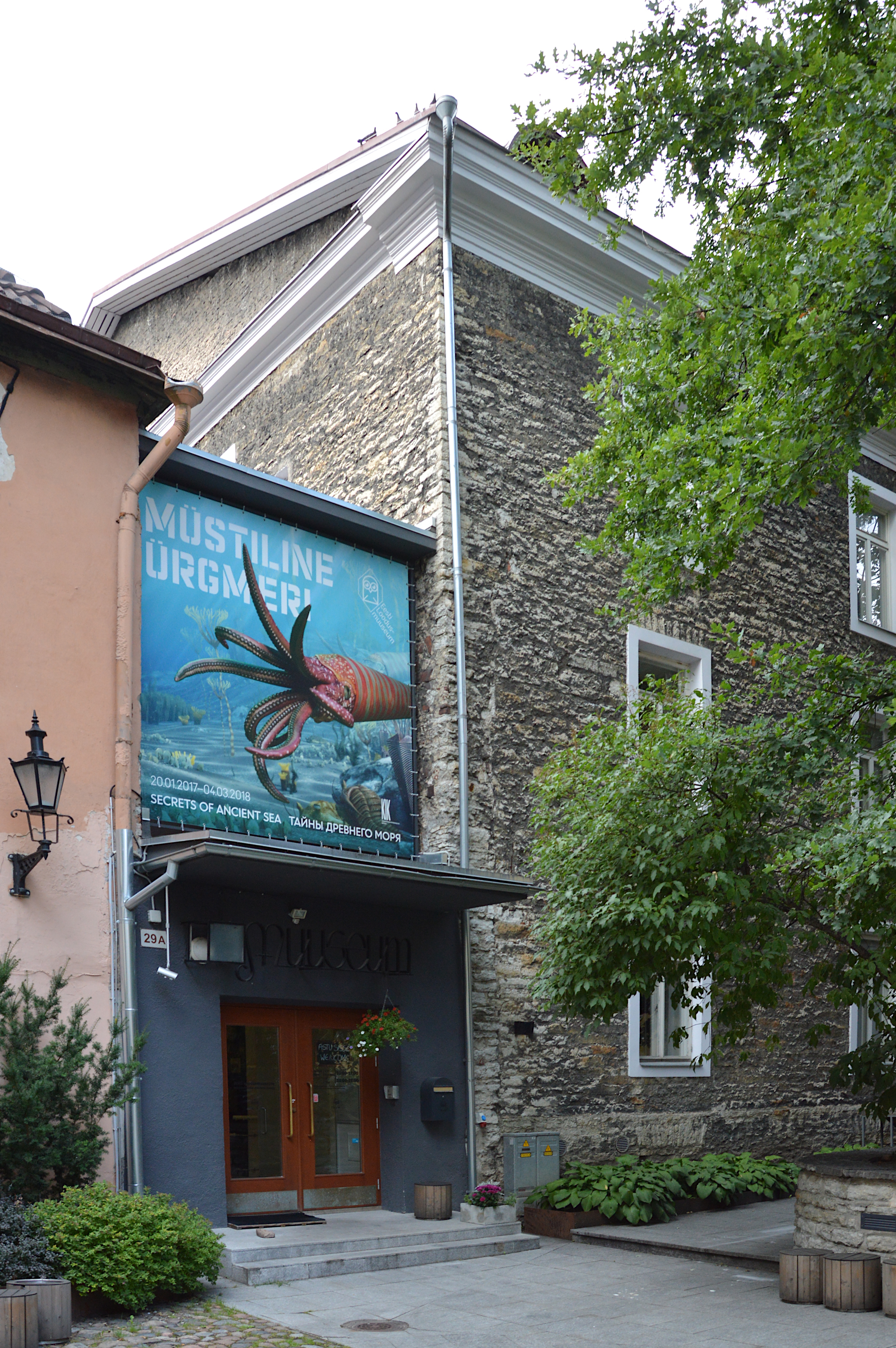
Estonian Museum of Natural History

The collections of the Estonian Museum of Natural History contain nearly 300,000 museum specimens. Approximately 90% of the plant, beetle, butterfly and moth, bird and mammal species found in Estonia are represented in the collections. A highly valuable part of the collections is made up by type specimens – the specimens used to provide the first description of a new taxon and serving as a definitive example of that taxon.

=== Botanical ===
The principal botanical collection contains approximately 122,000 plant specimens. The vascular plant herbarium includes 90,000 specimens, of which 88,700 are leaves, and the rest fruits, seeds, and strobili. Most of the material was collected in Estonia and the collection contains specimens of a predominant part of the domestic flora - 1,600 taxa. The collection's oldest specimens date back to the 1830s.

=== Mycological collections ===
The mycological herbarium includes approximately 2,450 plant specimens. The unlichenized fungi collection contains 250 samples. Of the more than 2,200 specimens included in the lichen i.e. lichenized fungi collection, approximately 1,600 were collected in Estonia and 600 from abroad (mainly Scandinavia and other parts of Europe).

=== Zoological ===
The zoological collections contains approximately 130,000 specimens. The collections boast a wide selection of both vertebrate and invertebrate species from Estonia as well as other parts of the world.

The zoological collections include:

- The ornithological collections
- The mammal collection
- The species-rich collection of mollusk shells, corals, and echinoderms
- The wet specimen collection
- The entomological collections

=== Geological ===
The museum's geological collection holds approximately 3,500 samples. Nearly three fourths of the specimens constitute paleontological material, the oldest specimens of which were collected in the mid-19th century. The dominant part of the paleontological collection is formed by Paleozoic fossils found in the Estonian bedrock. The most numerous samples among the preserved material include fossils of marine invertebrates from the Ordovician and Silurian Periods. The paleontological collections furthermore contain bone fractions and skeletal fragments of mammals of the Quaternary Period, most of which originate from Russia’s northern territories. Lithological collections hold typical sedimentary rocks of the Estonian bedrock: limestone, marl, sandstone, and mudstone. Petrological collections are small, with the main specimens being Estonian glacial erratic samples and samples of metamorphic rocks and igneous rocks collected from the territory of the former Soviet Union. The number of the museum’s mineralogical specimens has increased significantly during the last decade, owing to domestic and foreign donations. While minerals inserted into the collections in previous years mostly come from Russia, Eastern Europe, and Germany, the contemporary collection includes minerals from Australia, South America, and Africa. Some of the most notable mineralogical samples include large quartz, amethyst, and fluoride druses.

=== History of science collection ===
The history of science collection has approximately 1,050 archival materials and historical items related to the study and mediation of nature.

=== Photo collection ===
The photo collection contains photos, negatives and colour slides, 28,000 items in total, reflecting the daily life, exhibitions, field work and events of the museum throughout time. The photo collection of the museum has been digitised in the biodiversity information system PlutoF under the acronym TAMF.

== See also ==
- Estonian Museum of Applied Art and Design
- Museum of Estonian Architecture
