= Harry Duncan (publisher) =

- Born: Harry Alvin Duncan; April 19, 1916; Keokuk, Iowa, United States
- Died: April 18, 1997 (aged 80); Omaha, Nebraska, United States
- Occupations: Poet, Printer, Publisher, Librettist, Translator
- Spouse: Nancy Duncan
- Children: Guy Duncan; Barnaby Duncan; Lucy Elizabeth Duncan
- Writing career
- Genres: American poetry Letterpress printing

Harry Alvin Duncan (April 19, 1916 – April 18, 1997) was a hand-press printer, author, librettist, translator, and publisher under his imprint the Cummington Press. He was known for publishing early works by Robert Lowell, Tennessee Williams, Wallace Stevens, Allen Tate, Marianne Moore, William Logan, Stephen Berg, and Dana Gioia. A 1982 Newsweek article about the rebirth of the hand press movement said that Duncan was "considered the father of the post-World War II private-press movement."

== Career ==
Harry Duncan was born in Keokuk, Iowa and earned a bachelor's degree in English in 1938 from Grinnell College intending to become a poet. He enrolled in the English graduate program at Duke University, but never completed his master's degree. During graduate school he spent summers at Katherine Frazier's Cummington School of the Arts. While in Massachusetts he began publishing books of contemporary poetry using a hand press. He eventually chose to focus on letterpress printing instead of a graduate degree. The first Cummington Press book was published in 1939.

Duncan became director of the typographical laboratory at the University of Iowa's School of Journalism and moved the Cummington Press to Iowa City in 1956. In 1972, he moved to the University of Nebraska at Omaha (UNO) and began the university's fine arts press, Abattoir Editions, and taught. He retired from teaching in 1985 and returned to printing books full-time under the Cummington Press imprint. Duncan died on April 18, 1997, in Omaha, Nebraska.

Marking the centenary of his birth, the Fall 2016 issue of Parenthesis included a portrait of Harry Duncan on its cover along with three articles by or about Duncan: the text of his talk "New England Novitiate," "An Apprentice's Story" by Juan Nicanor Pascoe, and "A Checklist of Printed Work, 1939-1997" by Michael Peich and Denise Brady.
