= To a Waterfowl =

Poem by William Cullen Bryant

- by William Cullen Bryant
- Written: 1815
- First published in: North American Review in Volume 6, Issue 18, March 1818.
- Country: United States
- Language: English
- Subject: Waterfowl
- Publication date: 1818
- Lines: 32

Full text
- To a Waterfowl at Wikisource

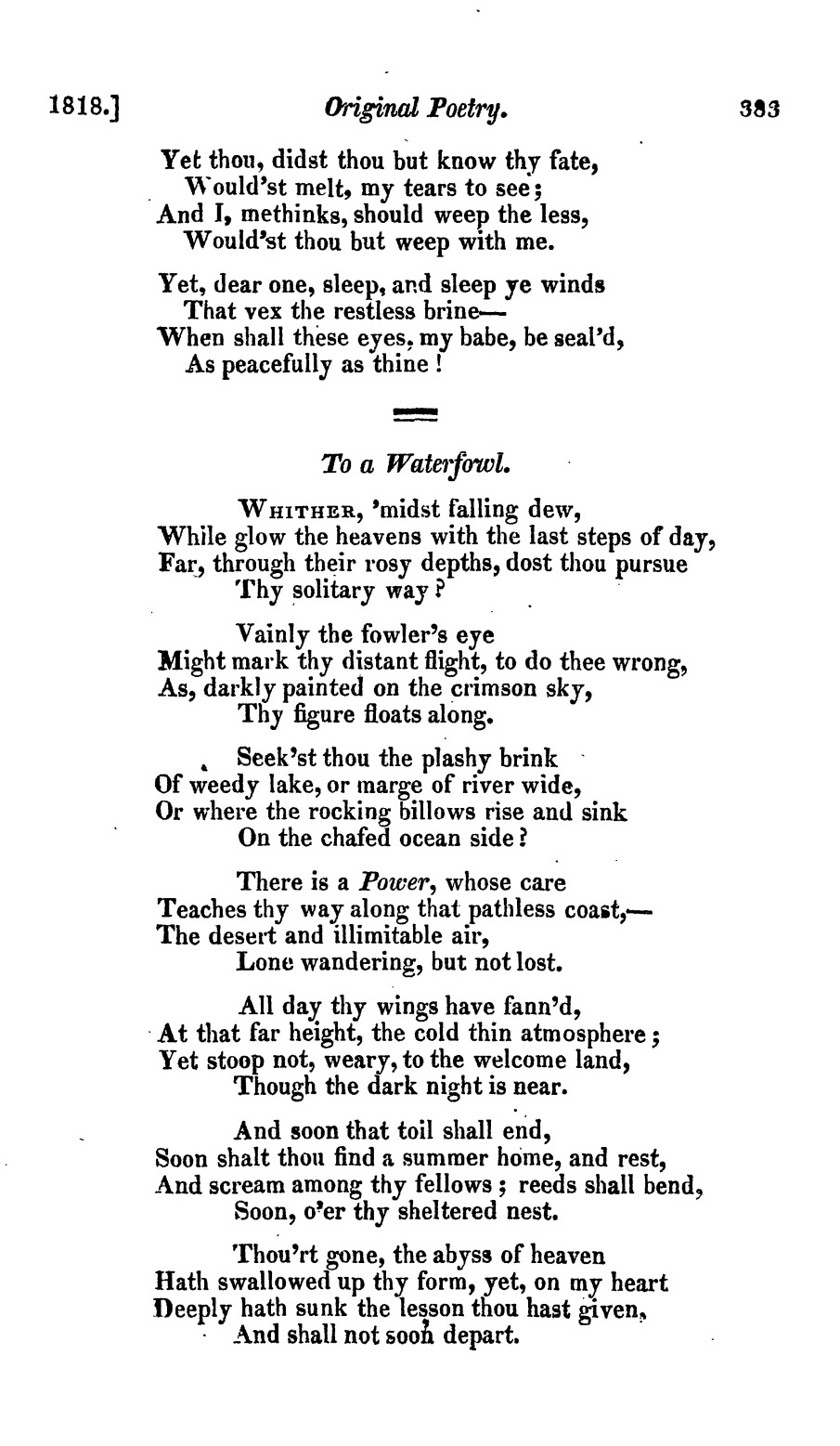
The first page of "To a Waterfowl" as published in The North American Review, March 1818

"To a Waterfowl" is a poem by American poet William Cullen Bryant, first published in 1818.

== Summary ==
The narrator questions where the waterfowl is going and questions his motives for flying. He warns the waterfowl that he could possibly find danger, traveling alone. But this waterfowl is not alone; it is being led by some Power. As the waterfowl disappears out of the narrator's sight, the narrator reflects on God's guidance in his own life. The narrator is sure that God has led this waterfowl, and that the waterfowl had faith in the narrator. Now, the narrator's faith is strengthened. He knows that God is guiding him as well.

As the narrator sees God directing the waterfowl, the narrator is reminded of God's guidance in his own life. Through his observance in nature, the narrator is reconnected with his faith in God.

== Composition and publication history ==
Bryant wrote the poem in July 1815. He was inspired after walking from Cummington to Plainfield to look for a place to settle as a lawyer. The duck, flying across the sunset, seemed to Bryant as solitary a soul as himself, and he wrote the poem that evening.

"To a Waterfowl" was first published in the North American Review in Volume 6, Issue 18, March 1818. It was later published in the collection Poems in 1821.

== Critical response ==
Matthew Arnold praised it as "the best short poem in the language".

== Analysis ==
"To a Waterfowl" is written in iambic trimeter and iambic pentameter, consisting of eight stanzas of four lines. The poem represents early stages of American Romanticism through celebration of Nature and God's presence within Nature.

Bryant is acknowledged as skillful at depicting American scenery but his natural details are often combined with a universal moral, as in "To a Waterfowl".

=== Figures of speech ===
- alliteration: While, Whither (lines 1-2); depths, dost (line 3); their, thou, thy (lines 3-); distant, do, darkly (lines 6-7)
- metaphor: last steps of day (comparison of the day to a creature that walks).
- anaphora: repetition of soon (lines 21, 22, 24). Anaphora is the repetition of a word, phrase, or clause at the beginning of word groups occurring one after the other. Examples: (1) Give me wine, give me women and give me song. (2) For everything there is a season . . . a time to be born, and a time to die; a time to plant, and a time to pluck up what is planted.—Bible, Ecclesiastes.
- personification: The speaker addresses the waterfowl as if it were a person, saying it has taught a lesson; he also refers to other waterfowls as fellows (line 23).
- apostrophe: The speaker addresses the waterfowl as if it could respond back
- metaphor: on my heart / deeply hath sunk the lesson (comparison of the heart to the intellect)
