= The Embargo =

The Embargo is a historical poem written by the American poet William Cullen Bryant in 1808. Bryant was a critic of Jeffersonian political philosophy, and the work was his attempt to satirize a shipping embargo imposed by Thomas Jefferson at the time.
