= Cummington, Massachusetts =

- Town
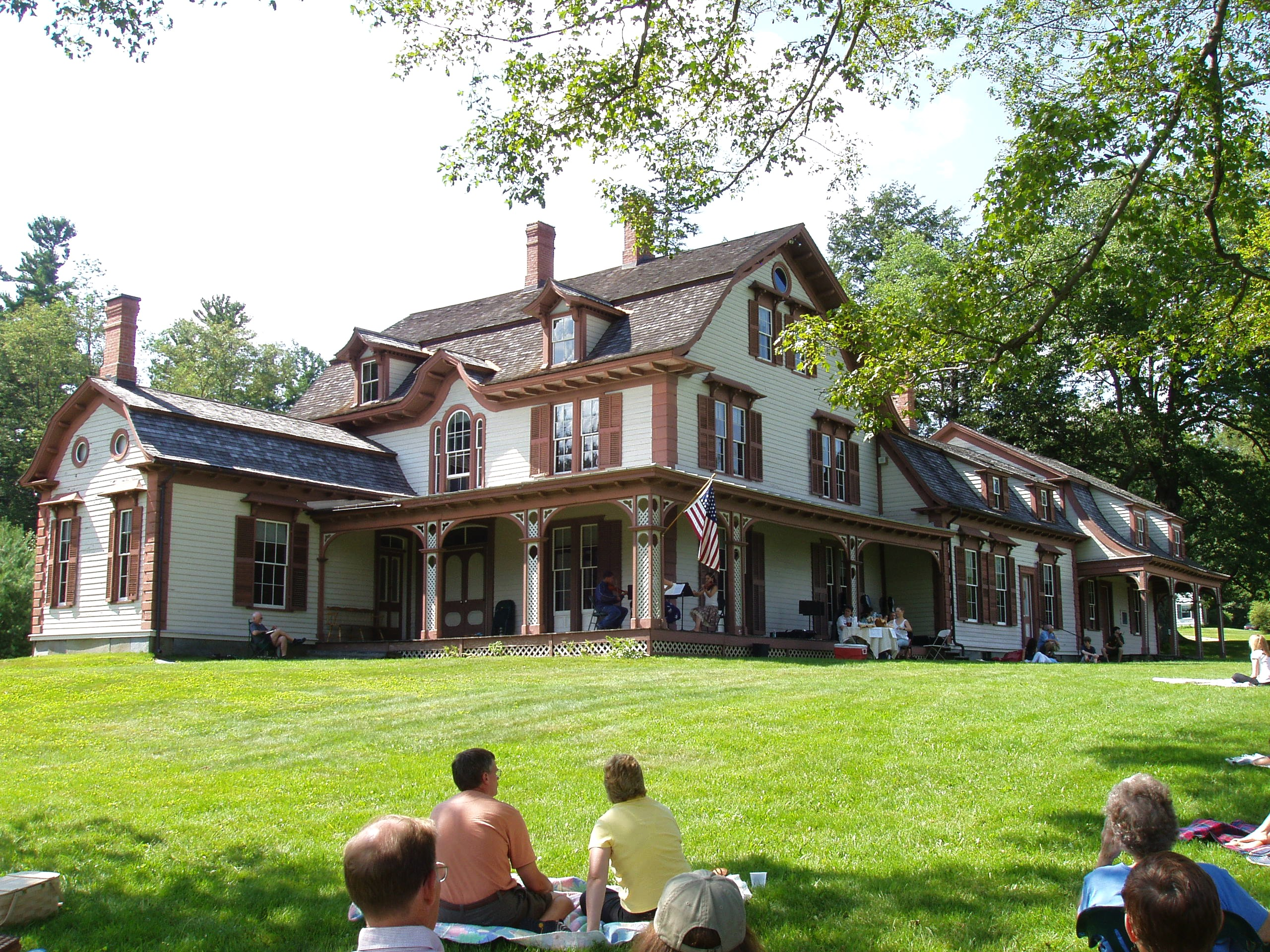
- William Cullen Bryant Homestead

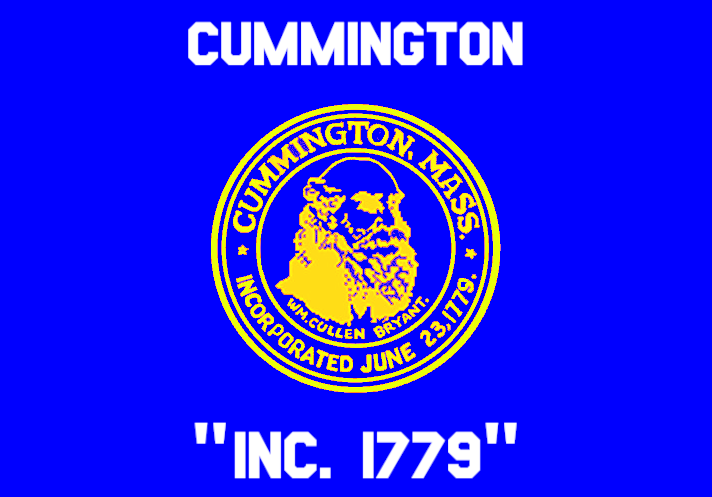
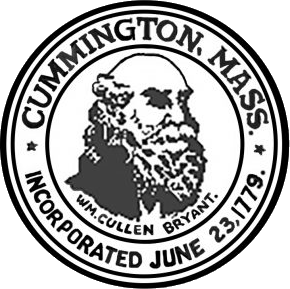
- Flag Seal

- Location in Hampshire County in Massachusetts
- Coordinates: 42°27′42″N 72°53′40″W
- Country: United States
- State: Massachusetts
- County: Hampshire
- Settled: 1762
- Incorporated: 1779

Government
  - Type: Open town meeting

Area
  - Total: 23.1 sq mi (59.7 km^{2})
  - Land: 22.9 sq mi (59.3 km^{2})
  - Water: 0.12 sq mi (0.3 km^{2})
- Elevation: 1,519 ft (463 m)

Population (2020)
  - Total: 829
  - Density: 36.2/sq mi (14.0/km^{2})
- Time zone: UTC−5 (Eastern)
  - Summer (DST): UTC−4 (Eastern)
- ZIP Code: 01026
- Area code: 413
- FIPS code: 25-16040
- GNIS feature ID: 0618198
- Website: www.cummington-ma.gov

Cummington is a town in Hampshire County, Massachusetts, United States. The population was 829 at the 2020 census, a decline from 872, tabulated in 2010. It is part of the Springfield, Massachusetts Metropolitan Statistical Area.

== History ==
Cummington was first settled in 1763 and officially incorporated in 1779. It was named after Colonel John Cumings, the original landholder.

The first Congregational Church minister was Reverend James Briggs of Norton, Massachusetts, a graduate of Yale College around 1775. Briggs was the son of Deacon James and Damaris (White) Briggs, and the husband of Anna Wiswall.

Several Revolutionary War patriots are buried in Cummington, including Nathaniel Holbrook, Seth Wilder Sr., and Seth Wilder Jr.

Noted poet and newspaper editor William Cullen Bryant was born in Cummington, and returned for many years to summer there. His house is now preserved and open to the public as the William Cullen Bryant Homestead. The town hosts the Cummington Fair every August. The fair features many events, including adult and 4-H exhibition halls, a craft barn, vaudeville stage, antique car parade, oxen pull, and an assortment of rides, games, and food stands.

The town was the subject of a 1945 documentary film, The Cummington Story, about the welcome given to a group of European refugees.

== Geography ==
Cummington is in northwestern Hampshire County. It is bordered to the west by the towns of Peru and Windsor in Berkshire County, to the north by Plainfield in Hampshire County, and to the northeast by Ashfield in Franklin County. To the east is the town of Goshen, to the southeast is Chesterfield, and to the south is Worthington, all in Hampshire County.

According to the United States Census Bureau, the town has an area of 23.1 square miles (59.7 km^{2}), of which 22.9 square miles (59.3 km^{2}) are land and 0.1 square miles (0.3 km^{2}), or 0.56%, are water. The Westfield River (sometimes called the East Branch) flows through Cummington. Massachusetts Route 9 runs through the town, following the Westfield River for most of its way. Route 9 leads southeast 20 miles (32 km) to Northampton and west 22 miles (35 km) to Pittsfield. Massachusetts Route 112 leads west, then south, 21 miles (34 km) to Huntington.

The mineral cummingtonite was first found in this town and was named after it.

== Demographics ==
Historical population
Year	Pop.	±%
1790	873	—
1850	1,172	+34.2%
1860	1,085	−7.4%
1870	1,037	−4.4%
1880	881	−15.0%
1890	787	−10.7%
1900	748	−5.0%
1910	637	−14.8%
1920	489	−23.2%
1930	531	+8.6%
1940	608	+14.5%
1950	620	+2.0%
1960	550	−11.3%
1970	562	+2.2%
1980	657	+16.9%
1990	785	+19.5%
2000	978	+24.6%
2010	872	−10.8%
2020	829	−4.9%
2022*	818	−1.3%
* = population estimate. Source: United States census records and Population Estimates Program data.

As of the census of 2000, there were 978 people, 382 households, and 239 families residing in the town. The population density was 42.4 inhabitants per square mile (16.4/km^{2}). There were 452 housing units at an average density of 19.6 per square mile (7.6/km^{2}). The racial makeup of the town was 96.42% White, 0.61% African American, 0.41% Native American, 0.31% Asian, 0.51% from other races, and 1.74% from two or more races. Hispanic or Latino of any race were 3.27% of the population.

There were 382 households, out of which 24.3% had children under the age of 18 living with them, 54.2% were married couples living together, 5.8% had a female householder with no husband present, and 37.4% were non-families. 28.0% of all households were made up of individuals, and 10.2% had someone living alone who was 65 years of age or older. The average household size was 2.26 and the average family size was 2.77.

In the town, the population was spread out, with 27.9% under the age of 18, 5.7% from 18 to 24, 30.3% from 25 to 44, 24.8% from 45 to 64, and 11.2% who were 65 years of age or older. The median age was 38 years. For every 100 females, there were 102.5 males. For every 100 females age 18 and over, there were 92.1 males.

The median income for a household in the town was $42,250, and the median income for a family was $48,750. Males had a median income of $31,765 versus $27,279 for females. The per capita income for the town was $21,553. About 4.2% of families and 6.6% of the population were below the poverty line, including 5.7% of those under age 18 and none of those age 65 or over.

== Education ==
Cummington is part of the Central Berkshire Regional School District, along with Becket, Dalton, Hinsdale, Peru, Washington, and Windsor. Elementary school students attend Craneville School, middle school students attend Nessacus Regional Middle School, and high school students attend Wahconah Regional High School.

== Government ==
The town is part of the First Hampshire District in the Massachusetts House of Representatives, and the Berkshire, Hampden, Franklin, and Hampshire Senate district.

== Points of interest ==
- William Cullen Bryant Homestead
- Greenwood Music Camp
- Kingman Tavern Historical Museum

== Notable people ==
- William Cullen Bryant, poet
- Katherine Frazier, musician and arts administrator
- Sergei Isupov, artist
- Rachel Maddow, MSNBC host
- Zalmon Richards, educator
- William Jay Smith, poet
- Worcester Reed Warner, engineer, philanthropist
- Alan Weisman, author
- Richard Wilbur, poet
