= Estonian Museum of Applied Art and Design =

Museum in Tallinn

- Eesti Tarbekunsti- ja Disainimuuseum
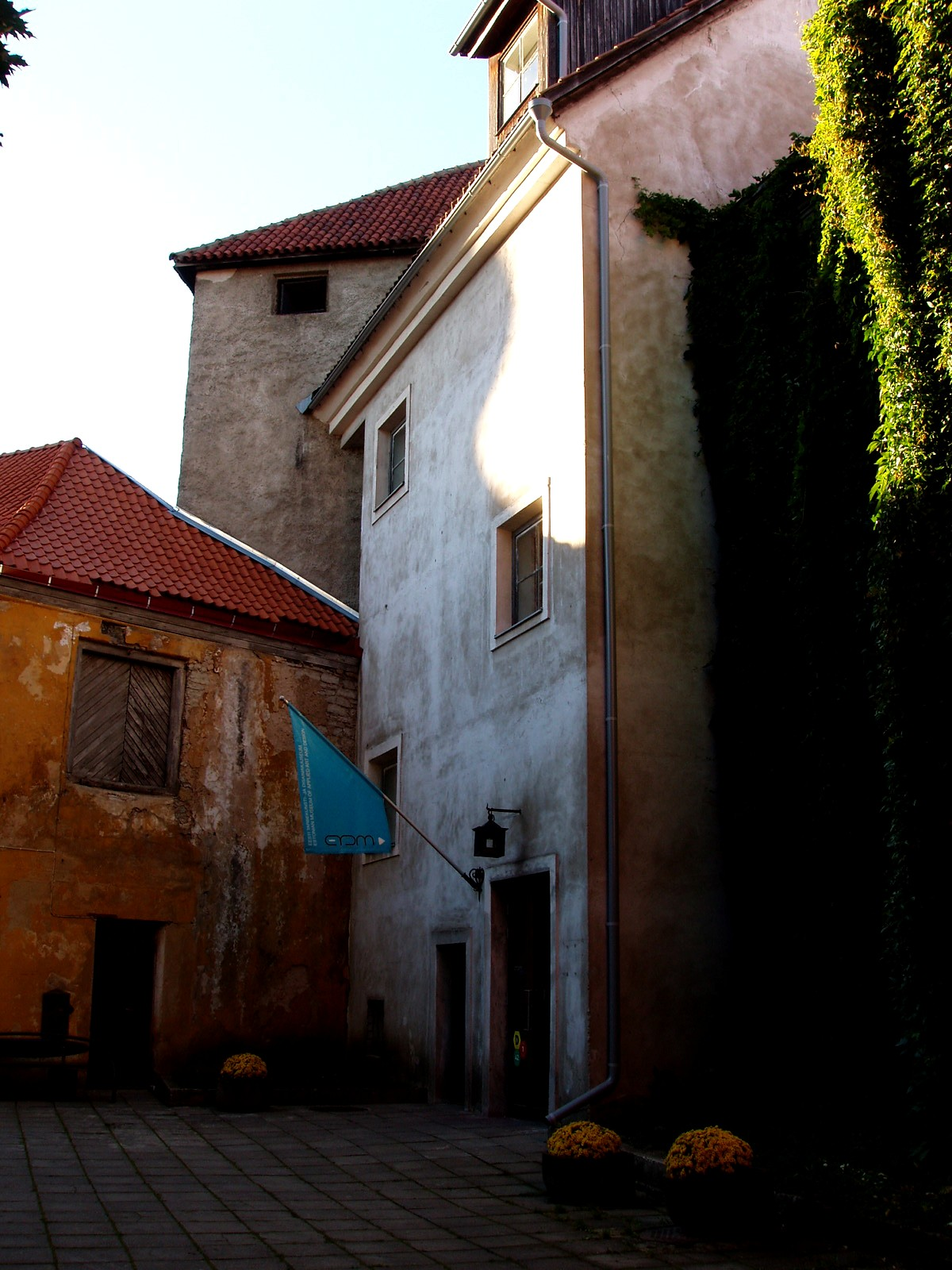
- Museum building in 2007. Originally it was a granary.
- Established: 1971
- Location: Lai 17, 10133 Tallinn, Estonia
- Coordinates: 59°26′23″N 24°44′42″E
- Type: Applied arts
- Website: www.etdm.ee/en/

Estonian Museum of Applied Art and Design (ETDM, Estonian: Eesti Tarbekunsti- ja Disainimuuseum) is a museum dedicated to the history of applied arts and design in Estonia. Located in Tallinn, the museum was established in 1971, and opened in 1980 as part of the Estonian National Art Museum branch. It became independent in 2004.

== The building ==
The museum is accommodated in an old three-storey building which used to be a granary. The granary was constructed between 1683 and 1695. The name of the main architect is unknown. The shape of the building is a slightly irregular rectangle. In 1823-1823, the building was renovated by architect J.D.Bantelmann.

After the restoration of the establishment in 1970 based on the project of architect Aala Buldas, it became suitable for an applied art museum.

== See also ==
- Estonian Museum of Natural History
- Museum of Estonian Architecture
