= Weybridge, Vermont =

- Town
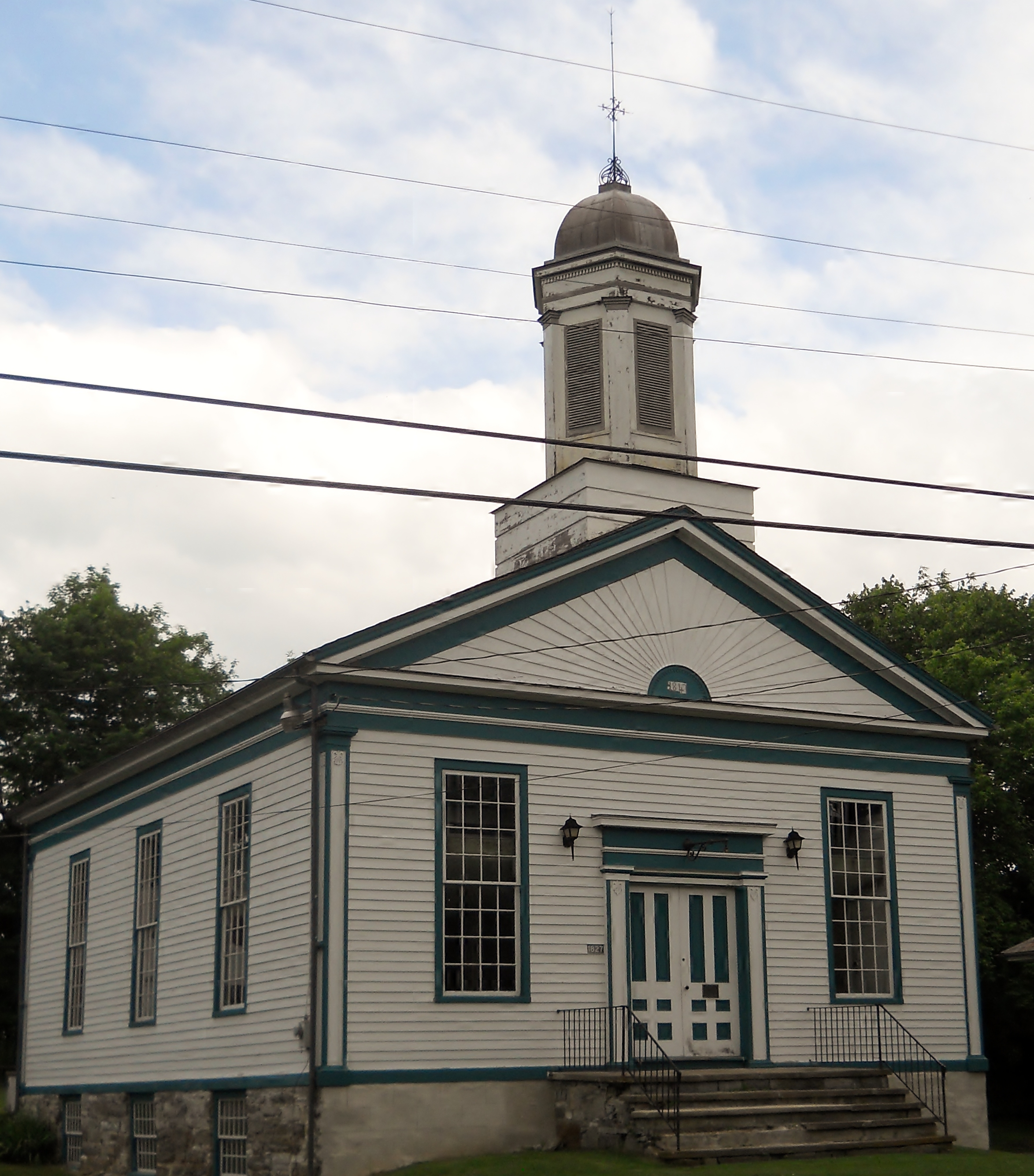
- The Weybridge Town Hall on Quaker Village Road
- Motto: The Town of Peace and Tranquility
- Location in Addison County and the state of Vermont
- Coordinates: 44°03′01″N 73°14′37″W
- Country: United States
- State: Vermont
- County: Addison
- Communities: Weybridge; Weybridge Hill

Area
  - Total: 17.6 sq mi (45.6 km^{2})
  - Land: 17.1 sq mi (44.4 km^{2})
  - Water: 0.46 sq mi (1.2 km^{2})
- Elevation: 171 ft (52 m)

Population (2020)
  - Total: 814
  - Density: 47/sq mi (18.3/km^{2})
- Time zone: UTC-5 (Eastern (EST))
  - Summer (DST): UTC-4 (EDT)
- ZIP code: 05753
- Area code: 802
- FIPS code: 50-83275
- GNIS feature ID: 1462258
- Website: www.townofweybridge.org

Weybridge is a town in Addison County, Vermont, United States. The population was 814 at the 2020 census.

== Geography ==
Weybridge is located in central Addison County in the Champlain Valley. It is bordered by the town of Middlebury to the southeast, Cornwall to the south, Bridport to the southwest, Addison to the west, and New Haven to the north. Otter Creek forms much of the northern and eastern border of the town.

According to the United States Census Bureau, the town has a total area of 17.6 square miles (45.6 km^{2}), of which 17.1 square miles (44.4 km^{2}) is land and 0.46 square miles (1.2 km^{2}), or 2.65%, is water.

== Demographics ==
Historical population
Census	Pop.	Note	%±
1790	175		—
1800	502		186.9%
1810	750		49.4%
1820	714		−4.8%
1830	850		19.0%
1840	797		−6.2%
1850	804		0.9%
1860	667		−17.0%
1870	627		−6.0%
1880	608		−3.0%
1890	543		−10.7%
1900	518		−4.6%
1910	494		−4.6%
1920	438		−11.3%
1930	418		−4.6%
1940	385		−7.9%
1950	402		4.4%
1960	430		7.0%
1970	618		43.7%
1980	667		7.9%
1990	749		12.3%
2000	824		10.0%
2010	833		1.1%
2020	814		−2.3%
U.S. Decennial Census

As of the census of 2000, there were 824 people, 322 households, and 230 families residing in the town. The population density was 48.5 people per square mile (18.7 people/km^{2}). There were 334 housing units at an average density of 19.6 units per square mile (7.6 units/km^{2}). The racial makeup of the town was 98.42% White, 0.61% African American, 0.49% Asian, and 0.49% from two or more races. Hispanic or Latino of any race were 1.58% of the population.

There were 322 households, out of which 32.9% had children under the age of 18 living with them, 64.3% were married couples living together, 4.3% had a female householder with no husband present, and 28.3% were non-families. 20.8% of all households were made up of individuals, and 10.9% had someone living alone who was 65 years of age or older. The average household size was 2.56 and the average family size was 2.99.

In the town, the age distribution of the population shows 25.0% under the age of 18, 4.5% from 18 to 24, 26.9% from 25 to 44, 28.6% from 45 to 64, and 14.9% who were 65 years of age or older. The median age was 41 years. For every 100 females, there were 94.8 males. For every 100 females age 18 and over, there were 94.3 males.

The median income for a household in the town was $51,833, and the median income for a family was $56,591. Males had a median income of $35,833 versus $30,089 for females. The per capita income for the town was $24,735. About 2.2% of families and 3.6% of the population were below the poverty line, including 3.4% of those under age 18 and 7.4% of those age 65 or over.

== Notable people ==
- Claire D. Ayer, state senator
- Chris Bohjalian, novelist
- Charity Bryant, writer, business owner
- Darius Clark, physician and politician
- Sylvia Drake, tailor, long-term partner of Charity Bryant
- Sidney Lawrence, US congressman
- George T. Tobin, American illustrator, native of Weybridge
- Silas Wright, US senator
- Julia Alvarez, writer
