= 2008 United States presidential election in Massachusetts =

- November 4, 2008
- Turnout: 73.53% (▲2.12 pp)

| Nominee | Barack Obama | John McCain |
| Party | Democratic | Republican |
| Home state | Illinois | Arizona |
| Running mate | Joe Biden | Sarah Palin |
| Electoral vote | 12 | 0 |
| Popular vote | 1,904,097 | 1,108,854 |
| Percentage | 61.80% | 35.99% |

Obama
40–50%
50–60%
60–70%
70–80%
80–90%
90–100%
McCain
40–50%
50–60%
President before election
George W. Bush
Republican
Elected President
Barack Obama
Democratic

The 2008 United States presidential election in Massachusetts took place, as in all 50 states and D.C., as part of the 2008 United States presidential election of November 4, 2008. Voters chose 12 representatives, or electors to the Electoral College, who, in turn, voted for the office of president and vice president.

Democratic Party nominee Barack Obama won the state by a 25.8% margin of victory: slightly better than John Kerry's 25.2% margin in 2004. Prior to the election, all 17 news organizations forecast that Obama would win Massachusetts, or otherwise considered it to be a safe blue state. Massachusetts had been a Democratic-leaning state since 1928, and a Democratic stronghold since 1960, and has maintained extremely large Democratic margins since 1996. No Republican presidential nominee has won a single county in the state, nor obtained more than 40% of the vote, since George H. W. Bush in 1988. In 2008, Democrat Barack Obama captured the state's 12 electoral votes winning 61.80% of the popular vote to Republican John McCain's 35.99%. Massachusetts was also 1 of only 6 states in which neither Obama nor McCain won during the primary season. (Note: The other states were Arkansas, Michigan, Nevada, Tennessee, and West Virginia.)

To date, this is the last time that the towns of Berkley, Brimfield, Brookfield, Carver, Dighton, Dudley, Holland, Oxford, Phillipston, Rehoboth, Spencer, and Warren voted Democratic.

== Primaries ==
=== Democratic ===
2008 Massachusetts Democratic presidential primary
- February 5, 2008

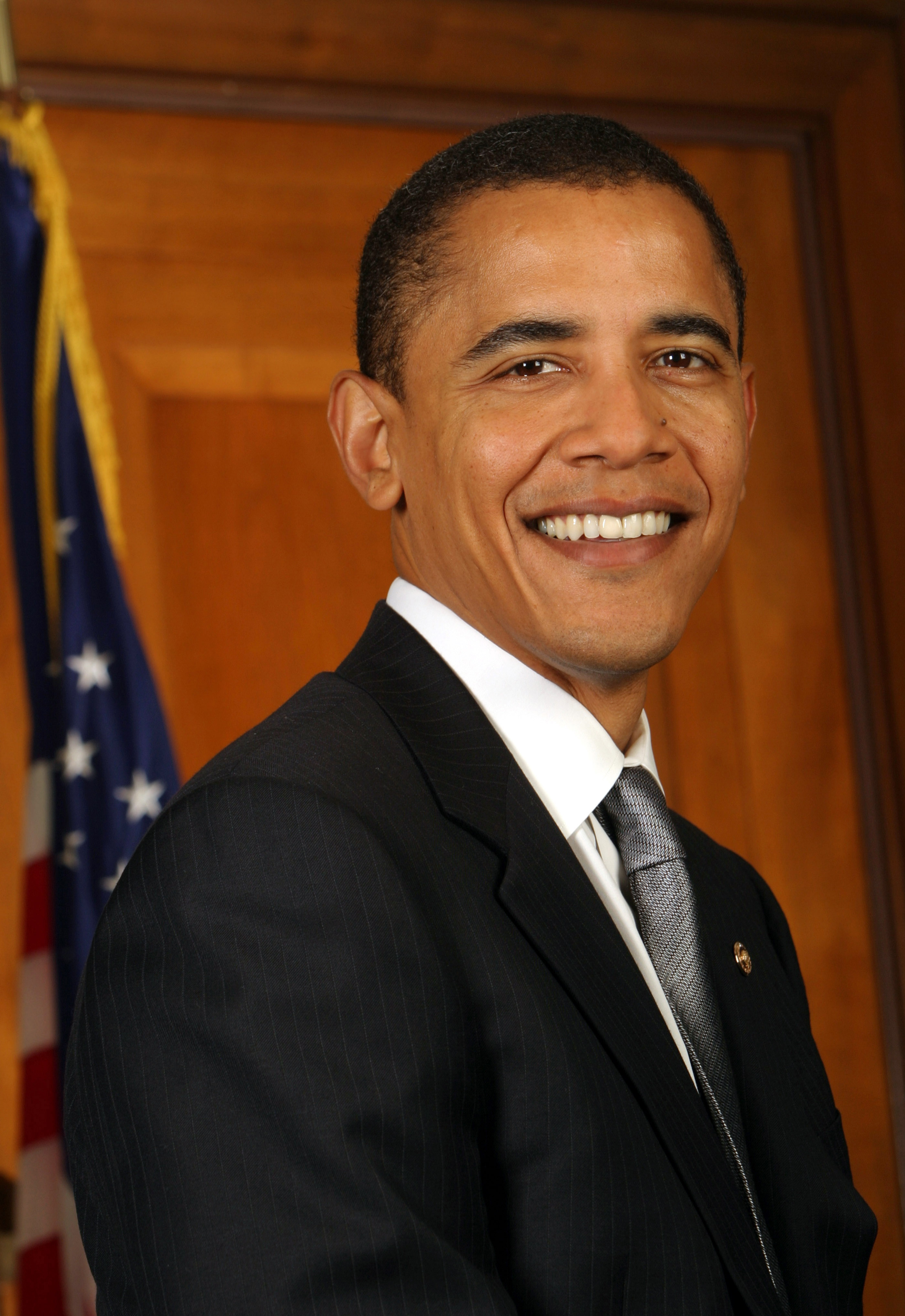
| Candidate | Hillary Clinton | Barack Obama |
| Party | Democratic | Democratic |
| Home state | New York | Illinois |
| Delegate count | 55 | 38 |
| Popular vote | 705,185 | 511,680 |
| Percentage | 56.01% | 40.64% |

The Massachusetts Democratic primary took place on Super Tuesday, February 5, 2008, and had a total of 93 delegates at stake. The winner in each of Massachusetts's 10 congressional districts was awarded all of that district's delegates, totaling 61. Another 32 delegates were awarded to the statewide winner, Hillary Clinton. The 93 delegates represented Massachusetts at the Democratic National Convention in Denver, Colorado. 26 other unpledged delegates, known as superdelegates, also attended the convention and cast their votes as well.

Polls indicated that Clinton was leading Barack Obama in the days leading up to the contest in Massachusetts.

Hillary Rodham Clinton won a convincing victory in Massachusetts over Barack Obama due to a number of factors. According to exit polls, 85% of voters in the Massachusetts Democratic Primary were Caucasians and they opted for Clinton by a margin of 58–40% compared to the 6% of African American voters who backed Obama by a margin of 66–29. Hispanics/Latinos, which comprised 5% of the total voters, backed Clinton by a margin of 56–36%. Clinton narrowly won the youth vote (those ages 18–29) by a margin of 49–48 and tied the vote among voters ages 30–44; she also won all voters over the age of 45 by a margin of 60.5–38. Pertaining to socioeconomic class, Clinton won all levels of family income except highly affluent voters making $200,000 or more a year, as they backed Obama by a narrow margin of 53–47%. As for educational attainment levels, Clinton won all categories except those with postgraduate degrees who backed Obama by a margin of 51–47%. Among self-identified Democrats in the primary, which made up 65% of the total electorate, they went for Clinton by a 58–41 margin while Independents, which comprised a healthy 33% of the electorate, also went for Clinton by a 54–42 margin. She also won all ideological groups. Clinton also won most major religious denominations – Protestants 53–46; Roman Catholics 64–33; other Christians 51–47; and other religions 49–46. Obama won Jews by a margin of 52–48 as well as atheists/agnostics by a margin of 53–45.

Clinton performed extremely well statewide, carrying a majority of counties and sweeping most of the major urban areas and cities. Obama won Boston by fewer than 10,000 votes, while Clinton won other urban and conservative towns such as Springfield and Worcester.

Obama had picked up major endorsements from the Massachusetts Democratic establishment prior to Super Tuesday. Both U.S. Senators Ted Kennedy and John Kerry threw their support behind Obama, along with Governor Deval Patrick. Clinton also picked up a number of top-tier endorsements from Mayor Thomas Menino of Boston and Speaker of the Massachusetts House of Representatives Salvatore DiMasi along with U.S. Representatives Richard Neal and Barney Frank, one of the three openly gay members of the U.S. Congress.

| Party | Candidate | Votes | Percentage | Delegates |
|---|---|---|---|---|
| Democratic | Hillary Clinton | 705,185 | 56.01% | 55 |
| Democratic | Barack Obama | 511,680 | 40.64% | 38 |
| Democratic | John Edwards | 20,101 | 1.60% | 0 |
| Democratic | Uncommitted | 8,041 | 0.64% | 0 |
| Democratic | Write-ins | 3,279 | 0.26% | 0 |
| Democratic | Joe Biden | 3,216 | 0.26% | 0 |
| Democratic | Dennis Kucinich | 2,992 | 0.24% | 0 |
| Democratic | Bill Richardson | 1,846 | 0.15% | 0 |
| Democratic | Mike Gravel | 1,463 | 0.12% | 0 |
| Democratic | Christopher Dodd | 1,120 | 0.09% | 0 |
| Totals | | 1,258,923 | 100.00% | 93 |
| Voter turnout | | % | | — |

=== Republican ===
2008 Massachusetts Republican presidential primary
- February 5, 2008
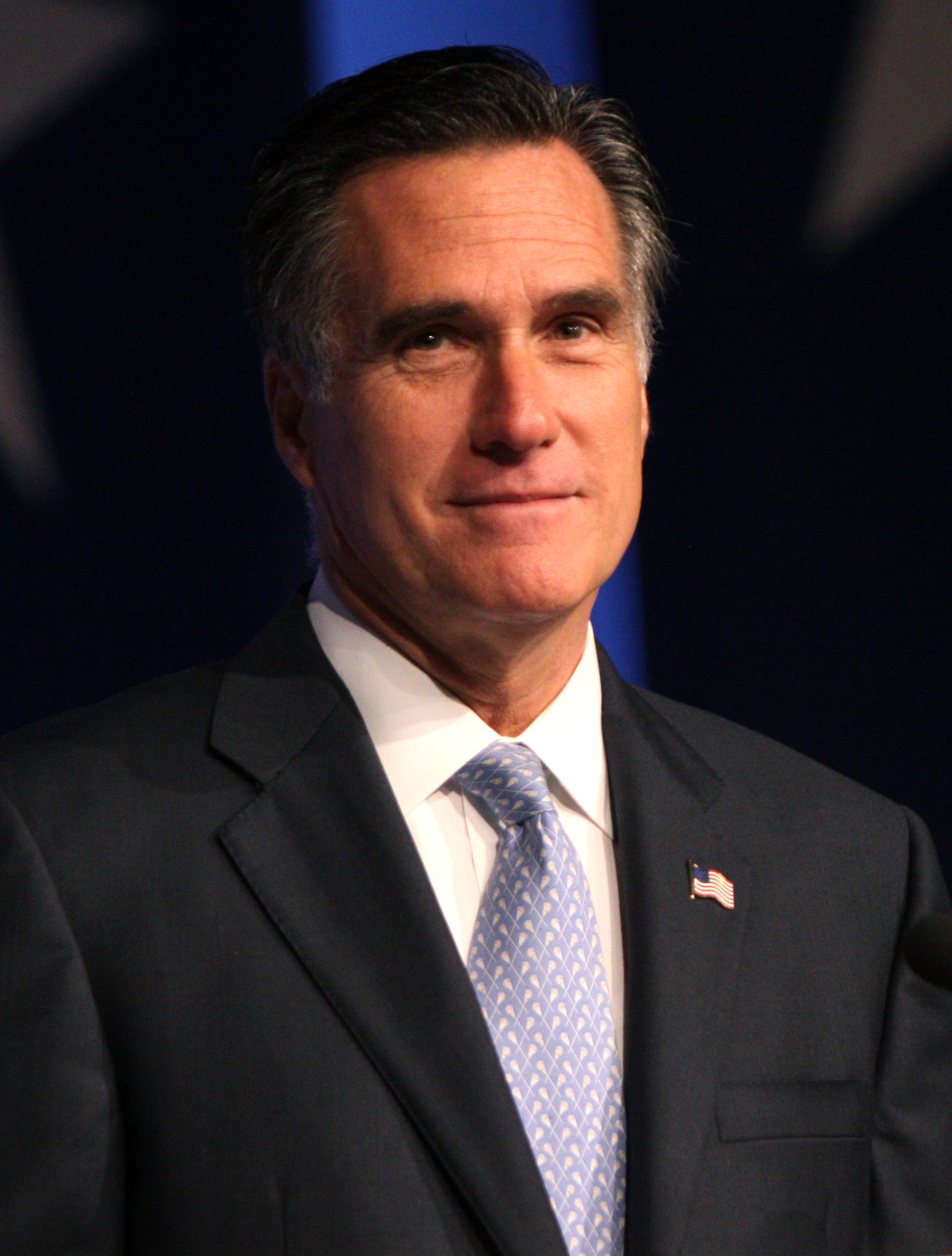

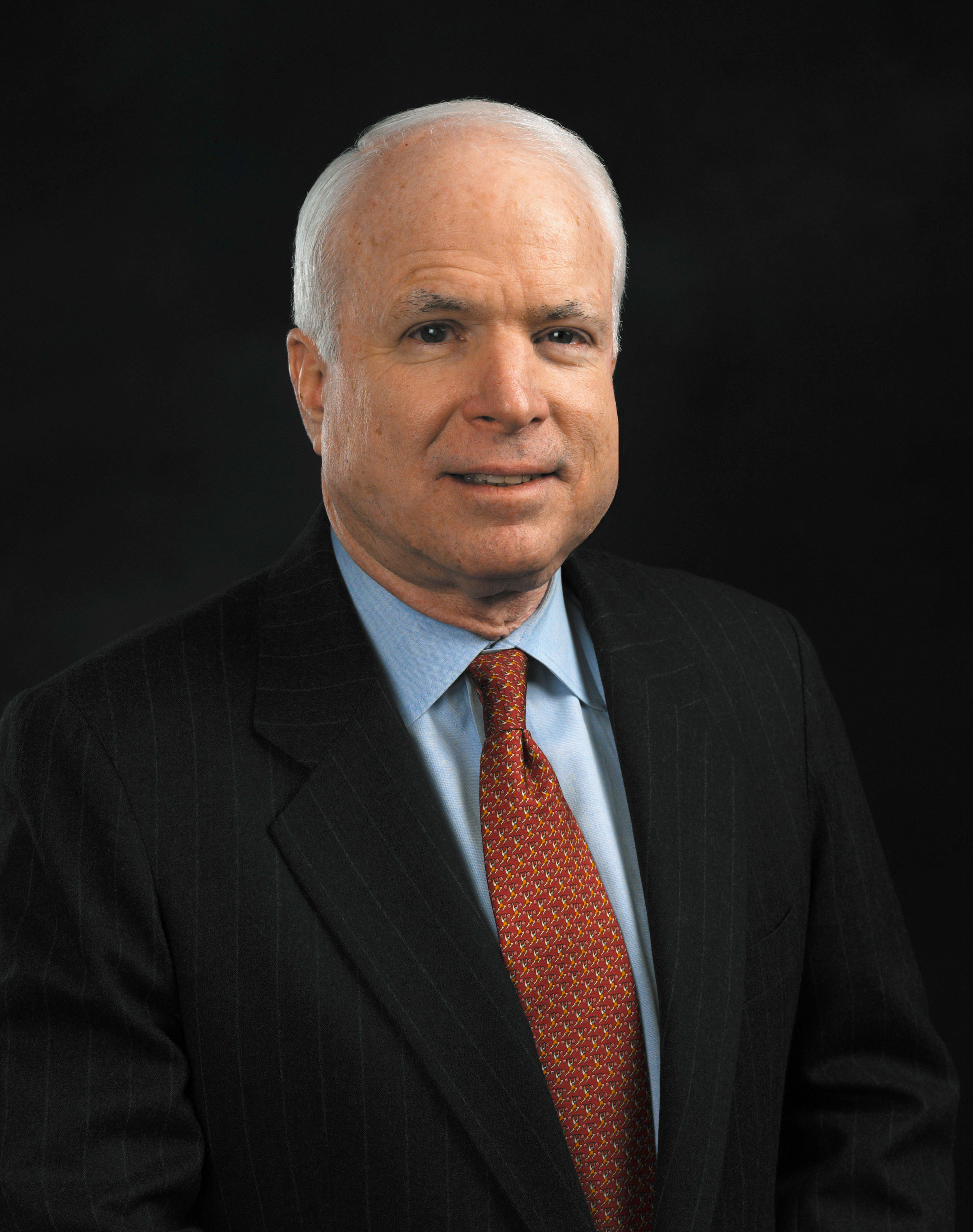
| Candidate | Mitt Romney | John McCain |
| Party | Republican | Republican |
| Home state | Massachusetts | Arizona |
| Delegate count | 21 | 17 |
| Popular vote | 255,892 | 204,779 |
| Percentage | 51.92% | 41.68% |

The Massachusetts Republican Primary took place on February 5, 2008, with 40 national delegates. Polls indicated that former Governor of Massachusetts Mitt Romney was leading rival John McCain; Romney ended up defeating McCain by roughly 10% of the vote.

Official Results
| Candidate | Votes | Percentage | Delegates |
|---|---|---|---|
| Mitt Romney | 255,892 | 51.12% | 21 |
| John McCain | 204,779 | 40.91% | 17 |
| Mike Huckabee | 19,103 | 3.82% | 0 |
| Ron Paul | 13,251 | 2.65% | 0 |
| Rudy Giuliani* | 2,707 | 0.54% | 0 |
| Fred Thompson* | 916 | 0.18% | 0 |
| Duncan Hunter* | 258 | 0.05% | 0 |
| All Others | 1,685 | 0.34% | 0 |
| Uncommitted | 1,959 | 0.39% | 0 |
| Total | 500,550 | 100% | 38 |

<tnowiki>*</tnowiki> Candidate dropped out of the race before the primary

=== Green-Rainbow ===
2008 Massachusetts Green-Rainbow presidential primary
- February 5, 2008
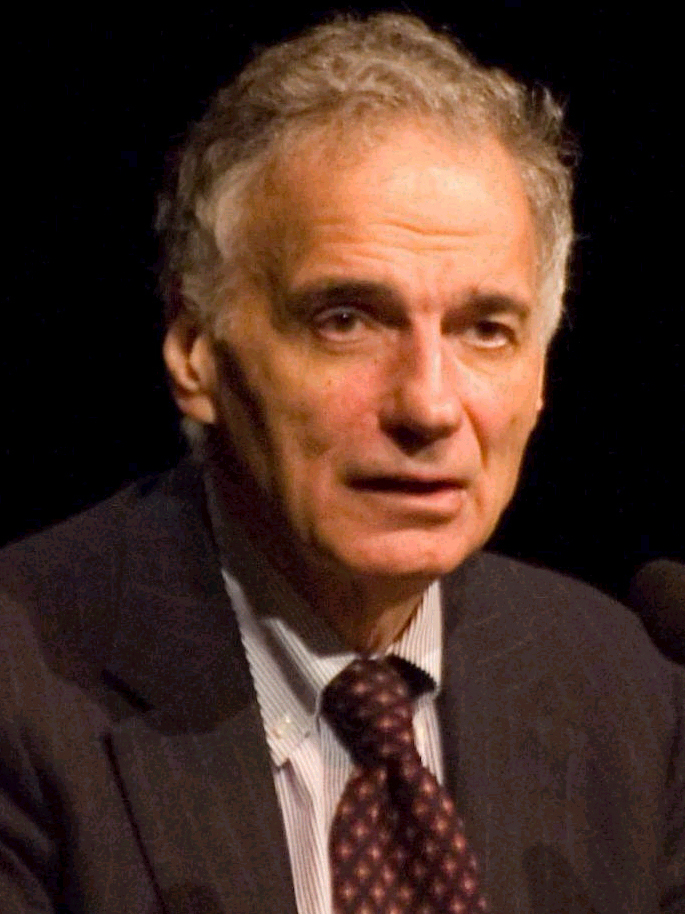

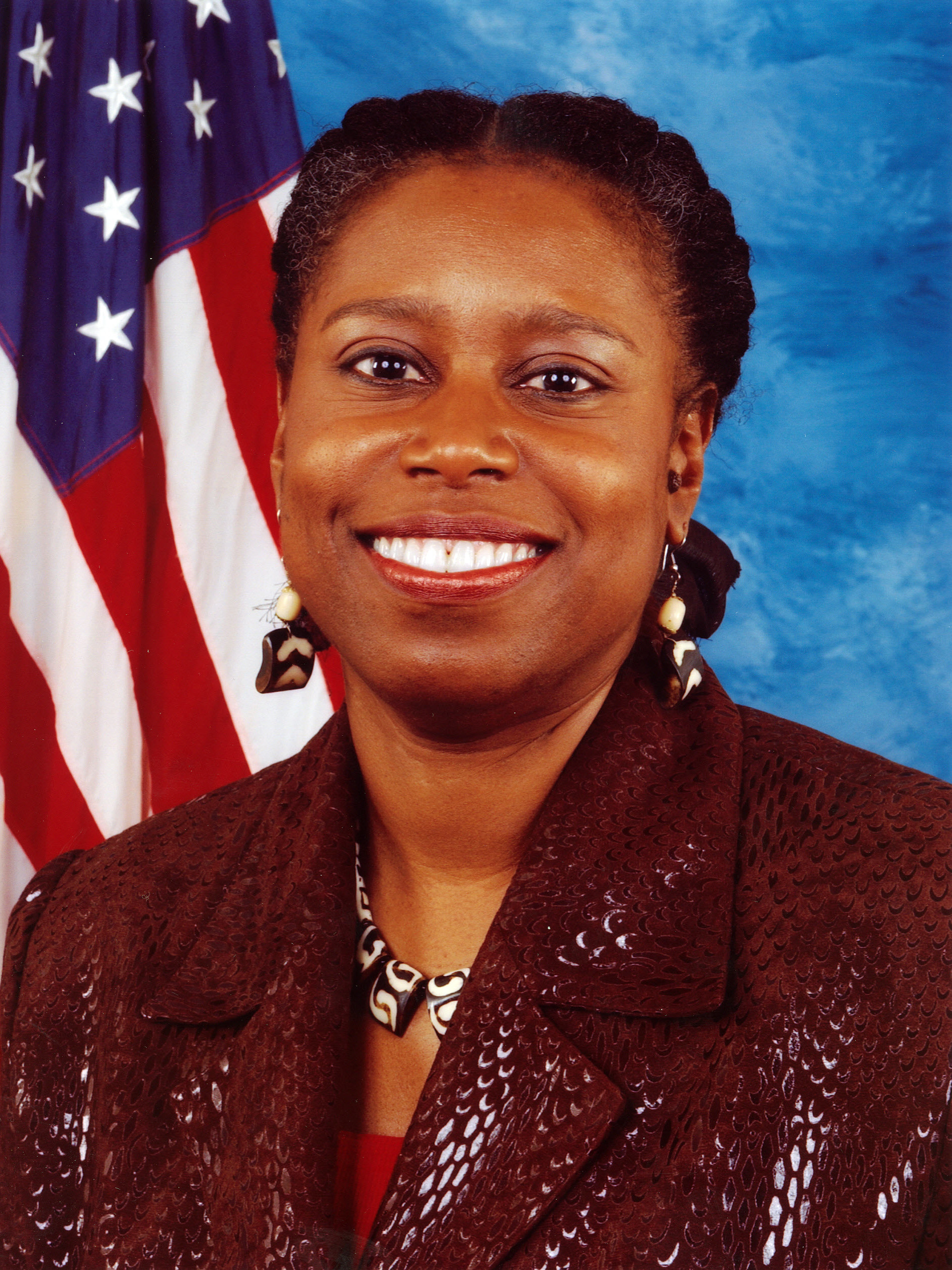
| Candidate | Ralph Nader | Cynthia McKinney |
| Party | Green | Green |
| Home state | District of Columbia | Georgia |
| Delegate count | 32 | 0 |
| Popular vote | 744 | 474 |
| Percentage | 39.91% | 25.43% |
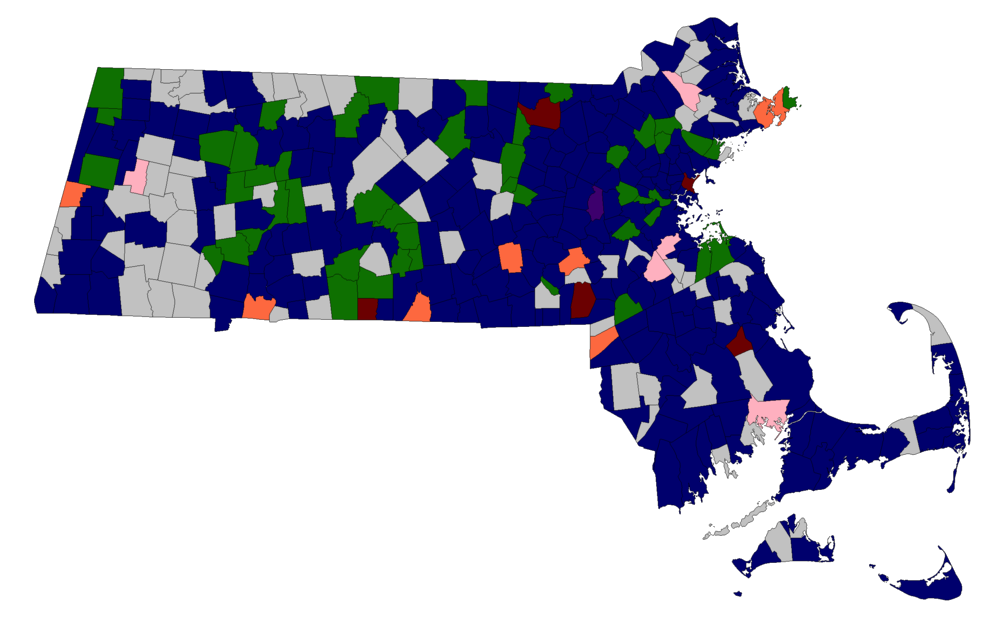
- Town results of the Massachusetts Green presidential primaries, 2008: Nader McKinney; Swift Ball; Mesplay Brown; No Votes

The Massachusetts Green-Rainbow primary took place on February 5. Six candidates appeared on the ballot. Ralph Nader won, despite not running for the nomination of the party.

Massachusetts Green-Rainbow presidential primary, February 5, 2008
| Candidate | Votes | Percentage | National delegates |
|---|---|---|---|
| Ralph Nader | 744 | 39.91% | 32 |
| Cynthia McKinney | 474 | 25.43% | - |
| Kat Swift | 60 | 3.22% | - |
| Jared Ball | 42 | 2.25% | - |
| Kent Mesplay | 39 | 2.09% | - |
| Elaine Brown | 38 | 2.04% | - |
| Others | 273 | 25.1% | - |
| No preference | 194 | 10.41% | - |
| Blank votes (not tallied) | 77 | n/a | n/a |
| Total | 1,941 | 100% | 32 |

=== Working Families Party ===
The Working Families Party did not have any candidates run in its presidential primary.

== Campaign ==
=== Predictions ===
There were 16 news organizations who made state-by-state predictions of the election. Here are their last predictions before election day:

| Source | Ranking |
|---|---|
| D.C. Political Report | Likely D |
| Cook Political Report | Solid D |
| The Takeaway | Solid D |
| Electoral-vote.com | Solid D |
| Washington Post | Solid D |
| Politico | Solid D |
| RealClearPolitics | Solid D |
| FiveThirtyEight | Solid D |
| CQ Politics | Solid D |
| The New York Times | Solid D |
| CNN | Safe D |
| NPR | Solid D |
| MSNBC | Solid D |
| Fox News | Likely D |
| Associated Press | Likely D |
| Rasmussen Reports | Safe D |

=== Polling ===
Very early on the election polls were tight, with McCain even leading by 5 in one poll on January 21 and a tie in a poll on March 16, but Obama won every poll after March 18. He won each by a double-digit margin since August 8. The final 3 polls averaged Obama leading 56% to 36%.

=== Fundraising ===
John McCain raised $4,072,206 in the state. Barack Obama raised $24,358,264.

=== Advertising and visits ===
Obama spent $46,839 while the Republican ticket spent nothing. Neither campaign visited the state.

== Analysis ==
In terms of voting in presidential elections, Massachusetts is one of the most heavily Democratic states in the nation. Massachusetts is ethnically diverse, highly educated, and less religious. The Bay State has voted for the Democratic presidential nominee in every election since 1960 except for Ronald Reagan's landslide victories of 1980 and 1984. In 1972, only Massachusetts and the District of Columbia voted for Democratic U.S. Senator George McGovern as Republican Richard M. Nixon won reelection.

Barack Obama won the state's 12 electoral votes with 61.80% of the vote to John McCain's 35.99%. This is slightly higher than Kerry's victory in 2004. Despite that, 4 counties in the state trended away from the Democratic party: Bristol, Plymouth, Norfolk, and Worcester.

Both of Massachusetts's U.S. Senators and all 10 of its U.S. Representatives were Democrats, and Democrats held supermajorities in the Massachusetts Legislature. At the same time in 2008, incumbent Democratic U.S. Senator John Kerry was reelected with 65.86% of the vote over Republican Jeff Beatty's 30.93% as were all of the state's delegates in the U.S. House of Representatives. At the state level, Democrats picked up three seats in the Massachusetts House of Representatives and one seat in the Massachusetts Senate.

== Results ==
2008 United States presidential election in Massachusetts
| Party | Candidate | Running mate | Votes | Percentage | Electoral votes |
|---|---|---|---|---|---|
| Democratic | Barack Obama | Joe Biden | 1,904,098 | 61.80% | 12 |
| Republican | John McCain | Sarah Palin | 1,108,854 | 35.99% | 0 |
| Independent | Ralph Nader | Matt Gonzalez | 28,841 | 0.94% | 0 |
| Independent | Others (Write-In) | | 14,483 | 0.47% | 0 |
| Libertarian | Bob Barr | Wayne Allyn Root | 13,189 | 0.43% | 0 |
| Green-Rainbow | Cynthia McKinney | Rosa Clemente | 6,550 | 0.21% | 0 |
| Constitution | Chuck Baldwin | Darrell Castle | 4,971 | 0.16% | 0 |
| Totals | | | 3,080,985 | 100.00% | 12 |
| Voter turnout (Voting age population) | | | | | 62.1% |

=== By county ===
| County | Barack Obama Democratic | | John McCain Republican | | Various candidates Other parties | | Margin | | Total votes cast |
| County | # | % | # | % | # | % | # | % | Total votes cast |
|---|---|---|---|---|---|---|---|---|---|
| Barnstable | 74,264 | 56.11% | 55,694 | 42.08% | 2,395 | 1.81% | 18,570 | 14.03% | 132,353 |
| Berkshire | 49,558 | 74.94% | 14,876 | 22.50% | 1,696 | 2.56% | 34,682 | 52.44% | 66,130 |
| Bristol | 146,861 | 60.41% | 90,531 | 37.24% | 5,728 | 2.36% | 56,330 | 23.17% | 243,120 |
| Dukes | 7,913 | 74.98% | 2,442 | 23.14% | 198 | 1.88% | 5,471 | 51.84% | 10,553 |
| Essex | 208,976 | 59.12% | 137,129 | 38.80% | 7,357 | 2.08% | 71,847 | 20.32% | 353,462 |
| Franklin | 27,919 | 72.46% | 9,545 | 24.77% | 1,065 | 2.76% | 18,374 | 47.69% | 38,529 |
| Hampden | 121,454 | 61.43% | 71,350 | 36.09% | 4,916 | 2.49% | 50,104 | 25.34% | 197,720 |
| Hampshire | 56,869 | 71.47% | 20,618 | 25.91% | 2,083 | 2.62% | 36,251 | 45.56% | 79,570 |
| Middlesex | 464,484 | 63.98% | 245,766 | 33.85% | 15,781 | 2.17% | 218,718 | 30.13% | 726,031 |
| Nantucket | 4,073 | 67.30% | 1,863 | 30.78% | 116 | 1.92% | 2,210 | 36.52% | 6,052 |
| Norfolk | 200,675 | 58.18% | 136,841 | 39.67% | 7,400 | 2.15% | 63,834 | 18.51% | 344,916 |
| Plymouth | 131,817 | 52.77% | 112,904 | 45.19% | 5,096 | 2.04% | 18,913 | 7.58% | 249,817 |
| Suffolk | 207,128 | 76.94% | 57,194 | 21.24% | 4,900 | 1.82% | 149,934 | 55.70% | 269,222 |
| Worcester | 202,107 | 55.59% | 152,101 | 41.83% | 9,386 | 2.58% | 50,006 | 13.76% | 363,594 |
| Totals | 1,904,098 | 61.80% | 1,108,854 | 35.99% | 68,117 | 2.21% | 795,244 | 25.81% | 3,081,069 |

=== By congressional district ===

Barack Obama swept all ten congressional districts in Massachusetts.

| District | Representative | McCain | Obama |
|---|---|---|---|
| 1 | John Olver | 33.54% | 64.17% |
| 2 | Richard Neal | 38.88% | 59.04% |
| 3 | Jim McGovern | 39.39% | 58.74% |
| 4 | Barney Frank | 34.67% | 63.66% |
| 5 | Niki Tsongas | 39.41% | 58.92% |
| 6 | John F. Tierney | 40.71% | 57.65% |
| 7 | Ed Markey | 33.34% | 64.96% |
| 8 | Mike Capuano | 13.74% | 85.58% |
| 9 | Stephen Lynch | 38.50% | 60.37% |
| 10 | William Delahunt | 43.60% | 54.87% |

=== By municipality ===
| Town/city | Barack Obama Democratic | | John McCain Republican | | Others | | Total votes |
| Town/city | % | # | % | # | % | # | Total votes |
|---|---|---|---|---|---|---|---|
| Abington | 50.6% | 4,094 | 46.5% | 3,765 | 2.9% | 238 | 8,097 |
| Acton | 67.8% | 7,894 | 29.9% | 3,477 | 2.3% | 264 | 11,635 |
| Acushnet | 57.8% | 3,232 | 37.7% | 2,110 | 4.5% | 251 | 5,593 |
| Adams | 74.8% | 3,066 | 21.8% | 893 | 3.4% | 140 | 4,099 |
| Agawam | 52.3% | 7,595 | 44.3% | 6,428 | 3.4% | 487 | 14,510 |
| Alford | 80.8% | 261 | 17.6% | 57 | 1.5% | 5 | 323 |
| Amesbury | 59.6% | 5,111 | 37.6% | 3,222 | 2.8% | 238 | 8,571 |
| Amherst | 86.6% | 11,198 | 10.1% | 1,307 | 3.3% | 432 | 12,937 |
| Andover | 55.5% | 10,177 | 42.5% | 7,798 | 2.0% | 369 | 18,344 |
| Aquinnah | 89.5% | 280 | 8.3% | 26 | 2.2% | 7 | 313 |
| Arlington | 72.1% | 18,365 | 25.1% | 6,407 | 2.8% | 716 | 25,488 |
| Ashburnham | 52.7% | 1,787 | 43.8% | 1,486 | 3.5% | 117 | 3,390 |
| Ashby | 47.0% | 885 | 49.5% | 932 | 3.4% | 64 | 1,881 |
| Ashfield | 79.5% | 903 | 17.4% | 198 | 3.1% | 35 | 1,136 |
| Ashland | 59.7% | 5,060 | 37.5% | 3,184 | 2.8% | 236 | 8,480 |
| Athol | 55.5% | 2,647 | 41.0% | 1,956 | 3.5% | 168 | 4,771 |
| Attleboro | 55.1% | 10,523 | 41.9% | 8,003 | 2.9% | 559 | 19,085 |
| Auburn | 53.6% | 4,794 | 43.0% | 3,849 | 3.4% | 307 | 8,950 |
| Avon | 48.4% | 1,173 | 47.8% | 1,159 | 3.8% | 92 | 2,424 |
| Ayer | 55.8% | 1,895 | 41.2% | 1,397 | 3.0% | 102 | 3,394 |
| Barnstable | 53.8% | 13,559 | 44.0% | 11,084 | 2.2% | 566 | 25,209 |
| Barre | 52.0% | 1,409 | 44.5% | 1,205 | 3.5% | 95 | 2,709 |
| Becket | 70.1% | 672 | 26.6% | 255 | 3.3% | 32 | 959 |
| Bedford | 60.7% | 4,516 | 36.6% | 2,718 | 2.7% | 201 | 7,435 |
| Belchertown | 62.4% | 4,829 | 34.7% | 2,683 | 2.9% | 221 | 7,733 |
| Bellingham | 51.9% | 4,364 | 45.0% | 3,783 | 3.2% | 266 | 8,413 |
| Belmont | 68.1% | 9,404 | 28.8% | 3,982 | 3.1% | 426 | 13,812 |
| Berkley | 48.4% | 1,585 | 47.6% | 1,558 | 4.0% | 132 | 3,275 |
| Berlin | 52.6% | 870 | 43.1% | 712 | 4.3% | 71 | 1,653 |
| Bernardston | 68.2% | 849 | 28.4% | 354 | 3.4% | 42 | 1,245 |
| Beverly | 59.4% | 12,247 | 37.7% | 7,780 | 2.8% | 587 | 20,614 |
| Billerica | 49.6% | 9,700 | 47.5% | 9,280 | 2.9% | 566 | 19,546 |
| Blackstone | 52.2% | 2,229 | 44.1% | 1,885 | 3.7% | 156 | 4,270 |
| Blandford | 48.4% | 339 | 49.1% | 344 | 2.6% | 18 | 701 |
| Bolton | 55.2% | 1,598 | 41.9% | 1,214 | 2.9% | 83 | 2,895 |
| Boston | 78.6% | 185,976 | 19.3% | 45,548 | 2.1% | 5001 | 236,525 |
| Bourne | 49.9% | 5,076 | 47.7% | 4,859 | 2.4% | 244 | 10,179 |
| Boxborough | 62.7% | 1,798 | 34.8% | 996 | 2.5% | 72 | 2,866 |
| Boxford | 45.9% | 2,286 | 51.9% | 2,586 | 2.2% | 109 | 4,981 |
| Boylston | 51.0% | 1,352 | 45.9% | 1,215 | 3.1% | 82 | 2,649 |
| Braintree | 49.4% | 9,298 | 47.6% | 8,964 | 3.0% | 570 | 18,832 |
| Brewster | 58.5% | 3,903 | 38.0% | 2,535 | 3.4% | 229 | 6,667 |
| Bridgewater | 48.6% | 5,889 | 48.4% | 5,861 | 3.0% | 360 | 12,110 |
| Brimfield | 48.0% | 984 | 47.8% | 979 | 4.2% | 86 | 2,049 |
| Brockton | 69.0% | 23,299 | 28.6% | 9,646 | 2.4% | 808 | 33,753 |
| Brookfield | 49.4% | 875 | 46.8% | 829 | 3.7% | 66 | 1,770 |
| Brookline | 80.4% | 22,484 | 17.3% | 4,842 | 2.3% | 645 | 27,971 |
| Buckland | 72.8% | 785 | 23.1% | 249 | 4.1% | 44 | 1,078 |
| Burlington | 53.1% | 6,822 | 44.4% | 5,703 | 2.6% | 330 | 12,855 |
| Cambridge | 87.5% | 40,876 | 10.1% | 4,697 | 2.5% | 1154 | 46,727 |
| Canton | 53.2% | 6,460 | 44.4% | 5,396 | 2.4% | 288 | 12,144 |
| Carlisle | 65.2% | 2,116 | 32.4% | 1,053 | 2.4% | 77 | 3,246 |
| Carver | 47.5% | 2,937 | 47.0% | 2,901 | 5.5% | 339 | 6,177 |
| Charlemont | 70.0% | 486 | 25.2% | 175 | 4.8% | 33 | 694 |
| Charlton | 44.4% | 2,883 | 52.6% | 3,411 | 3.0% | 192 | 6,486 |
| Chatham | 53.8% | 2,585 | 44.1% | 2,116 | 2.1% | 101 | 4,802 |
| Chelmsford | 52.9% | 10,360 | 44.5% | 8,712 | 2.6% | 511 | 19,583 |
| Chelsea | 73.4% | 5,926 | 22.5% | 1,820 | 4.1% | 328 | 8,074 |
| Cheshire | 69.5% | 1,318 | 26.8% | 508 | 3.7% | 70 | 1,896 |
| Chester | 52.0% | 369 | 43.7% | 310 | 4.2% | 30 | 709 |
| Chesterfield | 60.3% | 444 | 36.0% | 265 | 3.7% | 27 | 736 |
| Chicopee | 60.4% | 14,172 | 35.2% | 8,268 | 4.4% | 1038 | 23,478 |
| Chilmark | 80.5% | 597 | 16.8% | 125 | 2.7% | 20 | 742 |
| Clarksburg | 70.2% | 635 | 26.1% | 236 | 3.8% | 34 | 905 |
| Clinton | 56.9% | 3,701 | 39.4% | 2,563 | 3.7% | 242 | 6,506 |
| Cohasset | 51.5% | 2,383 | 46.6% | 2,156 | 1.9% | 90 | 4,629 |
| Colrain | 69.4% | 654 | 26.0% | 245 | 4.7% | 44 | 943 |
| Concord | 70.3% | 7,435 | 27.4% | 2,903 | 2.3% | 244 | 10,582 |
| Conway | 75.7% | 952 | 21.7% | 273 | 2.6% | 33 | 1,258 |
| Cummington | 69.5% | 376 | 27.4% | 148 | 3.1% | 17 | 541 |
| Dalton | 71.7% | 2,559 | 25.7% | 916 | 2.6% | 92 | 3,567 |
| Danvers | 53.8% | 7,558 | 43.4% | 6,093 | 2.8% | 399 | 14,050 |
| Dartmouth | 62.1% | 10,442 | 35.0% | 5,876 | 2.9% | 492 | 16,810 |
| Dedham | 55.3% | 7,108 | 41.7% | 5,361 | 3.0% | 388 | 12,857 |
| Deerfield | 71.5% | 2,198 | 25.6% | 786 | 3.0% | 91 | 3,075 |
| Dennis | 54.4% | 5,209 | 42.8% | 4,098 | 2.8% | 266 | 9,573 |
| Dighton | 48.1% | 1,732 | 47.8% | 1,719 | 4.1% | 147 | 3,598 |
| Douglas | 45.4% | 1,962 | 51.7% | 2,235 | 2.9% | 125 | 4,322 |
| Dover | 50.8% | 1,741 | 47.1% | 1,614 | 2.1% | 73 | 3,428 |
| Dracut | 48.5% | 7,216 | 48.9% | 7,284 | 2.6% | 384 | 14,884 |
| Dudley | 49.9% | 2,525 | 46.7% | 2,366 | 3.4% | 174 | 5,065 |
| Dunstable | 49.1% | 916 | 47.8% | 892 | 3.1% | 58 | 1,866 |
| Duxbury | 50.5% | 4,776 | 47.4% | 4,479 | 2.1% | 195 | 9,450 |
| East Bridgewater | 46.1% | 3,332 | 51.3% | 3,706 | 2.6% | 186 | 7,224 |
| East Brookfield | 42.7% | 506 | 55.0% | 651 | 2.3% | 27 | 1,184 |
| East Longmeadow | 49.7% | 4,296 | 47.6% | 4,109 | 2.7% | 235 | 8,640 |
| Eastham | 61.1% | 2,349 | 36.8% | 1,416 | 2.0% | 78 | 3,843 |
| Easthampton | 69.6% | 6,214 | 27.0% | 2,410 | 3.4% | 305 | 8,929 |
| Easton | 50.7% | 6,111 | 47.0% | 5,667 | 2.3% | 282 | 12,060 |
| Edgartown | 68.4% | 1,692 | 29.1% | 719 | 2.5% | 61 | 2,472 |
| Egremont | 77.7% | 658 | 20.1% | 170 | 2.2% | 19 | 847 |
| Erving | 70.1% | 565 | 26.8% | 216 | 3.1% | 25 | 806 |
| Essex | 55.2% | 1,220 | 42.9% | 947 | 1.9% | 42 | 2,209 |
| Everett | 64.2% | 8,338 | 31.9% | 4,140 | 3.9% | 505 | 12,983 |
| Fairhaven | 62.3% | 5,299 | 34.3% | 2,914 | 3.5% | 295 | 8,508 |
| Fall River | 71.0% | 22,591 | 24.9% | 7,933 | 4.1% | 1304 | 31,828 |
| Falmouth | 59.6% | 11,725 | 38.1% | 7,503 | 2.3% | 458 | 19,686 |
| Fitchburg | 59.6% | 8,596 | 37.3% | 5,378 | 3.2% | 458 | 14,432 |
| Florida | 62.1% | 267 | 34.2% | 147 | 3.7% | 16 | 430 |
| Foxborough | 51.4% | 4,702 | 46.1% | 4,216 | 2.5% | 231 | 9,149 |
| Framingham | 65.9% | 17,839 | 31.2% | 8,464 | 2.9% | 782 | 27,085 |
| Franklin | 52.4% | 8,800 | 44.9% | 7,535 | 2.7% | 458 | 16,793 |
| Freetown | 49.7% | 2,405 | 46.1% | 2,228 | 4.2% | 205 | 4,838 |
| Gardner | 58.6% | 4,936 | 37.6% | 3,171 | 3.8% | 321 | 8,428 |
| Georgetown | 49.7% | 2,358 | 47.9% | 2,271 | 2.5% | 117 | 4,746 |
| Gill | 73.1% | 672 | 23.9% | 220 | 2.9% | 27 | 919 |
| Gloucester | 63.5% | 9,967 | 32.6% | 5,113 | 3.9% | 604 | 15,684 |
| Goshen | 65.8% | 403 | 30.2% | 185 | 3.9% | 24 | 612 |
| Gosnold | 65.0% | 52 | 32.5% | 26 | 2.5% | 2 | 80 |
| Grafton | 52.3% | 4,722 | 44.9% | 4,057 | 2.7% | 248 | 9,027 |
| Granby | 54.9% | 1,967 | 41.9% | 1,502 | 3.2% | 115 | 3,584 |
| Granville | 43.3% | 381 | 52.6% | 462 | 4.1% | 36 | 879 |
| Great Barrington | 81.5% | 3,074 | 15.2% | 574 | 3.3% | 126 | 3,774 |
| Greenfield | 72.9% | 6,245 | 23.2% | 1,987 | 4.0% | 339 | 8,571 |
| Groton | 56.2% | 3,450 | 39.7% | 2,439 | 4.0% | 248 | 6,137 |
| Groveland | 49.1% | 1,898 | 48.3% | 1,867 | 2.6% | 102 | 3,867 |
| Hadley | 68.9% | 2,138 | 28.2% | 876 | 2.9% | 89 | 3,103 |
| Halifax | 47.1% | 1,928 | 49.5% | 2,026 | 3.5% | 143 | 4,097 |
| Hamilton | 52.7% | 2,494 | 44.8% | 2,120 | 2.4% | 114 | 4,728 |
| Hampden | 48.4% | 1,450 | 48.7% | 1,457 | 2.9% | 87 | 2,994 |
| Hancock | 62.2% | 248 | 33.1% | 132 | 4.8% | 19 | 399 |
| Hanover | 44.1% | 3,600 | 54.0% | 4,411 | 2.0% | 161 | 8,172 |
| Hanson | 46.9% | 2,571 | 50.3% | 2,758 | 2.8% | 153 | 5,482 |
| Hardwick | 54.8% | 776 | 41.1% | 582 | 4.0% | 57 | 1,415 |
| Harvard | 63.2% | 2,206 | 33.2% | 1,158 | 3.6% | 125 | 3,489 |
| Harwich | 55.7% | 4,538 | 40.7% | 3,314 | 3.6% | 291 | 8,143 |
| Hatfield | 66.2% | 1,405 | 31.0% | 658 | 2.8% | 59 | 2,122 |
| Haverhill | 57.3% | 15,552 | 39.8% | 10,814 | 2.8% | 772 | 27,138 |
| Hawley | 57.4% | 101 | 36.9% | 65 | 5.7% | 10 | 176 |
| Heath | 66.7% | 296 | 30.6% | 136 | 2.7% | 12 | 444 |
| Hingham | 52.9% | 7,129 | 45.2% | 6,099 | 1.9% | 260 | 13,488 |
| Hinsdale | 65.4% | 723 | 30.0% | 332 | 4.6% | 51 | 1,106 |
| Holbrook | 52.6% | 2,858 | 44.0% | 2,391 | 3.4% | 182 | 5,431 |
| Holden | 51.2% | 5,360 | 45.9% | 4,805 | 2.9% | 300 | 10,465 |
| Holland | 48.8% | 654 | 47.4% | 636 | 3.8% | 51 | 1,341 |
| Holliston | 58.4% | 4,830 | 38.9% | 3,219 | 2.7% | 221 | 8,270 |
| Holyoke | 71.1% | 11,034 | 25.8% | 4,000 | 3.2% | 489 | 15,523 |
| Hopedale | 54.4% | 1,847 | 42.8% | 1,451 | 2.8% | 96 | 3,394 |
| Hopkinton | 53.1% | 4,455 | 44.7% | 3,753 | 2.2% | 186 | 8,394 |
| Hubbardston | 46.5% | 1,188 | 49.8% | 1,272 | 3.8% | 96 | 2,556 |
| Hudson | 57.4% | 5,639 | 38.9% | 3,826 | 3.7% | 361 | 9,826 |
| Hull | 58.9% | 3,511 | 37.9% | 2,258 | 3.3% | 194 | 5,963 |
| Huntington | 53.2% | 608 | 42.2% | 482 | 4.6% | 53 | 1,143 |
| Ipswich | 56.0% | 4,573 | 41.4% | 3,381 | 2.6% | 213 | 8,167 |
| Kingston | 48.7% | 3,279 | 49.0% | 3,303 | 2.3% | 154 | 6,736 |
| Lakeville | 42.8% | 2,456 | 53.4% | 3,060 | 3.8% | 217 | 5,733 |
| Lancaster | 48.3% | 1,775 | 48.2% | 1,770 | 3.5% | 129 | 3,674 |
| Lanesborough | 69.2% | 1,164 | 28.8% | 484 | 2.0% | 34 | 1,682 |
| Lawrence | 79.5% | 15,632 | 18.4% | 3,624 | 2.1% | 404 | 19,660 |
| Lee | 72.1% | 2,192 | 24.6% | 748 | 3.3% | 100 | 3,040 |
| Leicester | 51.1% | 2,821 | 45.4% | 2,503 | 3.5% | 194 | 5,518 |
| Lenox | 75.5% | 2,305 | 21.7% | 662 | 2.8% | 84 | 3,051 |
| Leominster | 54.8% | 10,063 | 42.0% | 7,709 | 3.2% | 580 | 18,352 |
| Leverett | 83.8% | 1,053 | 13.4% | 168 | 2.8% | 35 | 1,256 |
| Lexington | 72.3% | 12,984 | 25.6% | 4,593 | 2.1% | 385 | 17,962 |
| Leyden | 72.4% | 344 | 23.6% | 112 | 4.0% | 19 | 475 |
| Lincoln | 75.1% | 2,627 | 22.6% | 791 | 2.2% | 78 | 3,496 |
| Littleton | 57.0% | 2,963 | 40.5% | 2,106 | 2.4% | 127 | 5,196 |
| Longmeadow | 57.0% | 5,517 | 40.8% | 3,946 | 2.2% | 211 | 9,674 |
| Lowell | 64.7% | 20,646 | 32.6% | 10,393 | 2.7% | 866 | 31,905 |
| Ludlow | 56.5% | 5,638 | 40.5% | 4,038 | 3.0% | 300 | 9,976 |
| Lunenburg | 50.2% | 2,889 | 47.0% | 2,706 | 2.8% | 161 | 5,756 |
| Lynn | 67.7% | 20,276 | 29.1% | 8,719 | 3.2% | 961 | 29,956 |
| Lynnfield | 43.2% | 3,018 | 54.6% | 3,811 | 2.2% | 155 | 6,984 |
| Malden | 67.2% | 13,865 | 29.5% | 6,075 | 3.3% | 688 | 20,628 |
| Manchester-by-the-Sea | 59.8% | 2,046 | 37.7% | 1,290 | 2.5% | 85 | 3,421 |
| Mansfield | 51.8% | 6,052 | 44.3% | 5,176 | 3.9% | 454 | 11,682 |
| Marblehead | 60.3% | 7,513 | 37.4% | 4,659 | 2.3% | 288 | 12,460 |
| Marion | 57.6% | 1,804 | 40.4% | 1,266 | 2.0% | 64 | 3,134 |
| Marlborough | 57.2% | 9,367 | 39.8% | 6,520 | 3.1% | 500 | 16,387 |
| Marshfield | 49.7% | 7,255 | 48.1% | 7,026 | 2.2% | 323 | 14,604 |
| Mashpee | 52.7% | 4,297 | 43.7% | 3,564 | 3.5% | 288 | 8,149 |
| Mattapoisett | 53.8% | 2,177 | 42.8% | 1,733 | 3.4% | 137 | 4,047 |
| Maynard | 62.5% | 3,549 | 34.7% | 1,967 | 2.8% | 158 | 5,674 |
| Medfield | 52.8% | 3,848 | 44.8% | 3,264 | 2.5% | 181 | 7,293 |
| Medford | 65.0% | 17,598 | 32.0% | 8,655 | 3.0% | 811 | 27,064 |
| Medway | 53.2% | 3,736 | 44.4% | 3,122 | 2.4% | 168 | 7,026 |
| Melrose | 59.3% | 9,139 | 37.9% | 5,846 | 2.7% | 420 | 15,405 |
| Mendon | 46.6% | 1,513 | 50.5% | 1,641 | 2.9% | 94 | 3,248 |
| Merrimac | 53.6% | 1,918 | 43.3% | 1,551 | 3.1% | 112 | 3,581 |
| Methuen | 53.4% | 11,263 | 44.1% | 9,303 | 2.6% | 543 | 21,109 |
| Middleborough | 45.1% | 5,155 | 51.2% | 5,857 | 3.7% | 429 | 11,441 |
| Middlefield | 64.7% | 194 | 32.7% | 98 | 2.7% | 8 | 300 |
| Middleton | 45.4% | 1,982 | 51.9% | 2,266 | 2.7% | 120 | 4,368 |
| Milford | 57.1% | 7,073 | 40.0% | 4,958 | 2.9% | 363 | 12,394 |
| Millbury | 51.6% | 3,440 | 44.9% | 2,996 | 3.5% | 233 | 6,669 |
| Millis | 54.1% | 2,494 | 43.3% | 1,996 | 2.6% | 118 | 4,608 |
| Millville | 47.4% | 733 | 49.9% | 772 | 2.7% | 42 | 1,547 |
| Milton | 60.8% | 9,486 | 36.9% | 5,753 | 2.3% | 352 | 15,591 |
| Monroe | 66.7% | 40 | 31.7% | 19 | 1.7% | 1 | 60 |
| Monson | 53.7% | 2,418 | 42.9% | 1,931 | 3.4% | 151 | 4,500 |
| Montague | 74.4% | 3,261 | 22.1% | 967 | 3.6% | 157 | 4,385 |
| Monterey | 79.0% | 464 | 18.6% | 109 | 2.4% | 14 | 587 |
| Montgomery | 45.8% | 236 | 49.9% | 257 | 4.3% | 22 | 515 |
| Mount Washington | 77.1% | 91 | 17.8% | 21 | 5.1% | 6 | 118 |
| Nahant | 58.0% | 1,343 | 38.3% | 887 | 3.6% | 84 | 2,314 |
| Nantucket | 67.0% | 4,073 | 30.6% | 1,863 | 2.4% | 145 | 6,081 |
| Natick | 62.8% | 11,406 | 33.3% | 6,050 | 3.9% | 699 | 18,155 |
| Needham | 65.4% | 11,331 | 32.6% | 5,652 | 2.0% | 353 | 17,336 |
| New Ashford | 66.2% | 96 | 27.6% | 40 | 6.2% | 9 | 145 |
| New Bedford | 72.5% | 24,881 | 23.9% | 8,201 | 3.6% | 1245 | 34,327 |
| New Braintree | 52.2% | 289 | 44.8% | 248 | 3.1% | 17 | 554 |
| New Marlborough | 71.7% | 601 | 25.4% | 213 | 2.9% | 24 | 838 |
| New Salem | 63.9% | 395 | 30.7% | 190 | 5.3% | 33 | 618 |
| Newbury | 53.7% | 2,326 | 43.5% | 1,883 | 2.8% | 120 | 4,329 |
| Newburyport | 65.0% | 7,118 | 32.1% | 3,517 | 2.8% | 309 | 10,944 |
| Newton | 74.6% | 33,360 | 23.0% | 10,283 | 2.4% | 1077 | 44,720 |
| Norfolk | 46.7% | 2,508 | 50.7% | 2,723 | 2.5% | 136 | 5,367 |
| North Adams | 76.0% | 4,519 | 20.2% | 1,203 | 3.8% | 226 | 5,948 |
| North Andover | 51.6% | 7,777 | 46.1% | 6,939 | 2.3% | 346 | 15,062 |
| North Attleborough | 49.7% | 7,099 | 47.0% | 6,713 | 3.3% | 471 | 14,283 |
| North Brookfield | 45.5% | 1,091 | 51.0% | 1,224 | 3.5% | 83 | 2,398 |
| North Reading | 47.9% | 4,056 | 50.0% | 4,233 | 2.0% | 171 | 8,460 |
| Northampton | 82.1% | 13,412 | 14.6% | 2,387 | 3.3% | 542 | 16,341 |
| Northborough | 55.4% | 4,516 | 41.7% | 3,401 | 2.8% | 232 | 8,149 |
| Northbridge | 47.6% | 3,625 | 49.2% | 3,748 | 3.2% | 242 | 7,615 |
| Northfield | 70.4% | 1,228 | 26.5% | 463 | 3.1% | 54 | 1,745 |
| Norton | 50.7% | 4,542 | 46.8% | 4,194 | 2.5% | 227 | 8,963 |
| Norwell | 46.5% | 2,947 | 51.4% | 3,263 | 2.1% | 134 | 6,344 |
| Norwood | 55.1% | 7,944 | 41.8% | 6,033 | 3.1% | 440 | 14,417 |
| Oak Bluffs | 71.8% | 1,931 | 26.3% | 706 | 1.9% | 51 | 2,688 |
| Oakham | 46.0% | 520 | 49.7% | 562 | 4.2% | 48 | 1,130 |
| Orange | 56.2% | 1,903 | 40.3% | 1,366 | 3.5% | 118 | 3,387 |
| Orleans | 57.4% | 2,677 | 40.1% | 1,870 | 2.5% | 117 | 4,664 |
| Otis | 58.7% | 504 | 37.0% | 318 | 4.3% | 37 | 859 |
| Oxford | 49.7% | 3,237 | 47.0% | 3,061 | 3.3% | 213 | 6,511 |
| Palmer | 54.4% | 3,229 | 41.8% | 2,481 | 3.8% | 226 | 5,936 |
| Paxton | 48.7% | 1,263 | 46.0% | 1,194 | 5.4% | 139 | 2,596 |
| Peabody | 56.0% | 14,818 | 40.8% | 10,800 | 3.1% | 823 | 26,441 |
| Pelham | 83.9% | 753 | 13.9% | 125 | 2.1% | 19 | 897 |
| Pembroke | 48.8% | 4,672 | 48.7% | 4,660 | 2.5% | 238 | 9,570 |
| Pepperell | 47.8% | 3,029 | 49.2% | 3,116 | 3.0% | 191 | 6,336 |
| Peru | 65.0% | 305 | 31.6% | 148 | 3.4% | 16 | 469 |
| Petersham | 56.6% | 466 | 40.2% | 331 | 3.2% | 26 | 823 |
| Phillipston | 52.0% | 501 | 44.3% | 427 | 3.7% | 36 | 964 |
| Pittsfield | 75.5% | 15,665 | 21.2% | 4,404 | 3.2% | 668 | 20,737 |
| Plainfield | 74.4% | 294 | 22.5% | 89 | 3.0% | 12 | 395 |
| Plainville | 49.2% | 2,114 | 47.4% | 2,036 | 3.4% | 147 | 4,297 |
| Plymouth | 52.3% | 15,180 | 45.2% | 13,139 | 2.5% | 722 | 29,041 |
| Plympton | 45.9% | 787 | 51.6% | 884 | 2.5% | 42 | 1,713 |
| Princeton | 50.8% | 1,138 | 45.0% | 1,008 | 4.2% | 95 | 2,241 |
| Provincetown | 86.9% | 2,067 | 10.8% | 256 | 2.4% | 56 | 2,379 |
| Quincy | 57.2% | 22,810 | 39.0% | 15,546 | 3.8% | 1509 | 39,865 |
| Randolph | 71.5% | 10,424 | 26.1% | 3,811 | 2.4% | 347 | 14,582 |
| Raynham | 47.1% | 3,336 | 49.8% | 3,524 | 3.1% | 216 | 7,076 |
| Reading | 55.5% | 7,694 | 42.1% | 5,831 | 2.4% | 335 | 13,860 |
| Rehoboth | 50.0% | 3,147 | 46.7% | 2,945 | 3.3% | 208 | 6,300 |
| Revere | 58.7% | 9,941 | 36.9% | 6,242 | 4.4% | 739 | 16,922 |
| Richmond | 73.8% | 720 | 22.9% | 223 | 3.3% | 32 | 975 |
| Rochester | 47.0% | 1,467 | 49.8% | 1,555 | 3.2% | 101 | 3,123 |
| Rockland | 49.9% | 4,318 | 46.6% | 4,035 | 3.4% | 298 | 8,651 |
| Rockport | 65.9% | 3,088 | 31.4% | 1,469 | 2.7% | 128 | 4,685 |
| Rowe | 53.0% | 140 | 39.4% | 104 | 7.6% | 20 | 264 |
| Rowley | 48.7% | 1,681 | 49.0% | 1,690 | 2.3% | 78 | 3,449 |
| Royalston | 57.4% | 399 | 37.3% | 259 | 5.3% | 37 | 695 |
| Russell | 50.1% | 409 | 45.3% | 370 | 4.5% | 37 | 816 |
| Rutland | 48.2% | 2,027 | 49.5% | 2,081 | 2.3% | 98 | 4,206 |
| Salem | 67.7% | 13,080 | 29.0% | 5,601 | 3.3% | 635 | 19,316 |
| Salisbury | 53.8% | 2,270 | 43.2% | 1,823 | 3.1% | 129 | 4,222 |
| Sandisfield | 61.2% | 274 | 32.1% | 144 | 6.7% | 30 | 448 |
| Sandwich | 49.0% | 6,126 | 47.5% | 5,942 | 3.5% | 440 | 12,508 |
| Saugus | 50.1% | 6,769 | 46.8% | 6,314 | 3.1% | 421 | 13,504 |
| Savoy | 67.8% | 274 | 27.5% | 111 | 4.7% | 19 | 404 |
| Scituate | 52.1% | 5,850 | 45.6% | 5,121 | 2.3% | 263 | 11,234 |
| Seekonk | 54.8% | 4,067 | 41.3% | 3,061 | 3.9% | 290 | 7,418 |
| Sharon | 65.1% | 6,622 | 31.2% | 3,179 | 3.7% | 373 | 10,174 |
| Sheffield | 72.3% | 1,378 | 23.7% | 452 | 3.9% | 75 | 1,905 |
| Shelburne | 75.6% | 916 | 20.3% | 246 | 4.1% | 50 | 1,212 |
| Sherborn | 59.5% | 1,609 | 38.0% | 1,029 | 2.5% | 67 | 2,705 |
| Shirley | 51.2% | 1,609 | 45.2% | 1,421 | 3.6% | 114 | 3,144 |
| Shrewsbury | 56.1% | 10,000 | 40.9% | 7,296 | 3.0% | 533 | 17,829 |
| Shutesbury | 84.3% | 1,038 | 12.5% | 154 | 3.2% | 40 | 1,232 |
| Somerset | 61.8% | 6,368 | 34.3% | 3,537 | 3.9% | 398 | 10,303 |
| Somerville | 80.7% | 26,665 | 15.8% | 5,215 | 3.6% | 1181 | 33,061 |
| South Hadley | 62.3% | 5,671 | 35.1% | 3,199 | 2.6% | 240 | 9,110 |
| Southampton | 55.7% | 1,911 | 41.3% | 1,416 | 2.9% | 101 | 3,428 |
| Southborough | 55.8% | 3,201 | 41.5% | 2,379 | 2.7% | 152 | 5,732 |
| Southbridge | 63.4% | 4,466 | 33.3% | 2,346 | 3.3% | 232 | 7,044 |
| Southwick | 46.3% | 2,267 | 50.4% | 2,467 | 3.3% | 160 | 4,894 |
| Spencer | 49.4% | 2,799 | 47.6% | 2,697 | 3.1% | 173 | 5,669 |
| Springfield | 75.8% | 39,516 | 21.7% | 11,331 | 2.4% | 1274 | 52,121 |
| Sterling | 45.8% | 2,159 | 51.4% | 2,423 | 2.8% | 132 | 4,714 |
| Stockbridge | 79.6% | 998 | 17.1% | 214 | 3.3% | 41 | 1,253 |
| Stoneham | 54.5% | 6,625 | 43.0% | 5,231 | 2.5% | 300 | 12,156 |
| Stoughton | 58.0% | 7,915 | 38.8% | 5,296 | 3.1% | 425 | 13,636 |
| Stow | 57.6% | 2,319 | 39.6% | 1,592 | 2.8% | 113 | 4,024 |
| Sturbridge | 52.6% | 2,738 | 44.6% | 2,322 | 2.8% | 148 | 5,208 |
| Sudbury | 63.0% | 6,502 | 35.0% | 3,613 | 2.1% | 212 | 10,327 |
| Sunderland | 76.2% | 1,433 | 20.4% | 383 | 3.4% | 64 | 1,880 |
| Sutton | 44.8% | 2,362 | 51.9% | 2,736 | 3.3% | 176 | 5,274 |
| Swampscott | 62.3% | 5,103 | 34.7% | 2,844 | 3.0% | 244 | 8,191 |
| Swansea | 57.1% | 4,887 | 39.8% | 3,408 | 3.1% | 268 | 8,563 |
| Taunton | 58.3% | 13,243 | 38.2% | 8,677 | 3.6% | 812 | 22,732 |
| Templeton | 50.9% | 1,909 | 45.3% | 1,701 | 3.8% | 142 | 3,752 |
| Tewksbury | 48.4% | 7,628 | 48.8% | 7,683 | 2.8% | 435 | 15,746 |
| Tisbury | 75.0% | 1,830 | 22.2% | 541 | 2.8% | 69 | 2,440 |
| Tolland | 46.4% | 128 | 50.0% | 138 | 3.6% | 10 | 276 |
| Topsfield | 47.3% | 1,824 | 47.6% | 1,837 | 5.1% | 198 | 3,859 |
| Townsend | 46.0% | 2,326 | 50.8% | 2,572 | 3.2% | 162 | 5,060 |
| Truro | 73.0% | 1,056 | 24.4% | 353 | 2.6% | 37 | 1,446 |
| Tyngsborough | 48.0% | 2,955 | 50.1% | 3,085 | 2.0% | 121 | 6,161 |
| Tyringham | 69.3% | 194 | 28.2% | 79 | 2.5% | 7 | 280 |
| Upton | 50.2% | 2,077 | 46.6% | 1,927 | 3.2% | 131 | 4,135 |
| Uxbridge | 48.1% | 3,476 | 48.8% | 3,532 | 3.1% | 226 | 7,234 |
| Wakefield | 54.4% | 7,743 | 42.9% | 6,118 | 2.7% | 385 | 14,246 |
| Wales | 52.6% | 537 | 43.7% | 446 | 3.6% | 37 | 1,020 |
| Walpole | 48.3% | 6,600 | 49.2% | 6,712 | 2.5% | 343 | 13,655 |
| Waltham | 62.6% | 15,276 | 34.3% | 8,383 | 3.1% | 746 | 24,405 |
| Ware | 56.0% | 2,552 | 40.0% | 1,821 | 4.0% | 182 | 4,555 |
| Wareham | 56.8% | 6,199 | 40.3% | 4,398 | 2.9% | 317 | 10,914 |
| Warren | 50.5% | 1,184 | 45.3% | 1,062 | 4.1% | 97 | 2,343 |
| Warwick | 72.4% | 328 | 24.3% | 110 | 3.3% | 15 | 453 |
| Washington | 73.5% | 258 | 23.4% | 82 | 3.1% | 11 | 351 |
| Watertown | 71.1% | 11,520 | 26.2% | 4,249 | 2.7% | 431 | 16,200 |
| Wayland | 67.2% | 5,488 | 30.3% | 2,476 | 2.5% | 204 | 8,168 |
| Webster | 51.6% | 3,461 | 44.4% | 2,975 | 4.0% | 269 | 6,705 |
| Wellesley | 63.7% | 9,270 | 33.6% | 4,885 | 2.8% | 405 | 14,560 |
| Wellfleet | 70.0% | 1,550 | 27.0% | 597 | 3.0% | 66 | 2,213 |
| Wendell | 83.5% | 474 | 12.1% | 69 | 4.4% | 25 | 568 |
| Wenham | 50.4% | 1,182 | 47.2% | 1,108 | 2.3% | 55 | 2,345 |
| West Boylston | 50.3% | 2,019 | 47.1% | 1,891 | 2.6% | 104 | 4,014 |
| West Bridgewater | 42.6% | 1,701 | 54.2% | 2,163 | 3.2% | 128 | 3,992 |
| West Brookfield | 49.7% | 1,010 | 46.0% | 936 | 4.3% | 87 | 2,033 |
| West Newbury | 54.4% | 1,508 | 43.4% | 1,202 | 2.2% | 62 | 2,772 |
| West Springfield | 54.9% | 6,751 | 41.7% | 5,128 | 3.3% | 410 | 12,289 |
| West Stockbridge | 79.7% | 720 | 16.8% | 152 | 3.4% | 31 | 903 |
| West Tisbury | 81.7% | 1,531 | 16.0% | 299 | 2.3% | 44 | 1,874 |
| Westborough | 58.6% | 5,308 | 38.6% | 3,496 | 2.9% | 259 | 9,063 |
| Westfield | 52.6% | 9,304 | 43.9% | 7,762 | 3.5% | 622 | 17,688 |
| Westford | 54.0% | 6,795 | 43.7% | 5,501 | 2.3% | 286 | 12,582 |
| Westhampton | 61.1% | 681 | 37.2% | 414 | 1.7% | 19 | 1,114 |
| Westminster | 49.8% | 2,144 | 46.3% | 1,992 | 3.9% | 166 | 4,302 |
| Weston | 60.0% | 3,902 | 37.6% | 2,446 | 2.4% | 155 | 6,503 |
| Westport | 61.3% | 5,319 | 35.6% | 3,087 | 3.0% | 264 | 8,670 |
| Westwood | 52.0% | 4,564 | 45.4% | 3,985 | 2.6% | 226 | 8,775 |
| Weymouth | 52.7% | 14,727 | 44.2% | 12,358 | 3.0% | 845 | 27,930 |
| Whately | 66.4% | 660 | 29.2% | 290 | 4.4% | 44 | 994 |
| Whitman | 48.3% | 3,504 | 48.7% | 3,531 | 3.0% | 214 | 7,249 |
| Wilbraham | 49.3% | 4,230 | 47.3% | 4,062 | 3.4% | 292 | 8,584 |
| Williamsburg | 77.0% | 1,309 | 19.5% | 331 | 3.5% | 60 | 1,700 |
| Williamstown | 79.1% | 2,957 | 18.9% | 707 | 2.0% | 74 | 3,738 |
| Wilmington | 48.3% | 5,812 | 49.2% | 5,923 | 2.5% | 307 | 12,042 |
| Winchendon | 53.1% | 2,294 | 43.2% | 1,866 | 3.8% | 163 | 4,323 |
| Winchester | 59.0% | 7,381 | 38.7% | 4,846 | 2.2% | 281 | 12,508 |
| Windsor | 71.5% | 398 | 25.5% | 142 | 3.1% | 17 | 557 |
| Winthrop | 57.7% | 5,284 | 39.2% | 3,584 | 3.1% | 284 | 9,152 |
| Woburn | 53.2% | 10,237 | 44.0% | 8,466 | 2.7% | 526 | 19,229 |
| Worcester | 66.9% | 41,352 | 29.9% | 18,474 | 3.2% | 1982 | 61,808 |
| Worthington | 67.3% | 510 | 29.3% | 222 | 3.4% | 26 | 758 |
| Wrentham | 47.2% | 2,911 | 49.8% | 3,073 | 3.0% | 187 | 6,171 |
| Yarmouth | 53.4% | 7,547 | 43.8% | 6,187 | 2.9% | 405 | 14,139 |

== Electors ==
Technically the voters of Massachusetts cast their ballots for electors: representatives to the Electoral College. Massachusetts is allocated 12 electors because it has 10 congressional districts and 2 senators. All candidates who appear on the ballot or qualify to receive write-in votes must submit a list of 12 electors, who pledge to vote for their candidate and his or her running mate. Whoever wins the majority of votes in the state is awarded all 12 electoral votes. Their chosen electors then vote for president and vice president. Although electors are pledged to their candidate and running mate, they are not obligated to vote for them. An elector who votes for someone other than his or her candidate is known as a faithless elector.

The electors of each state and the District of Columbia met on December 15, 2008, to cast their votes for president and vice president. The Electoral College itself never meets as one body. Instead the electors from each state and the District of Columbia met in their respective capitols.

The following were the members of the Electoral College from the state. All 12 were pledged to Obama and Biden:

1. Brenda Brathwaite
2. Mary Ann Dube
3. Patricia Marcus
4. Faye Morrison
5. Carol Pacheco
6. Corinne Wingard
7. John Brissette
8. Raymond Jordan
9. Joe Kaplan
10. Melvin Poindexter
11. Samuel Poulten
12. Jason Whittet

== See also ==
- United States presidential elections in Massachusetts
- 2008 Democratic Party presidential primaries
