= Washington, Massachusetts =

- Town
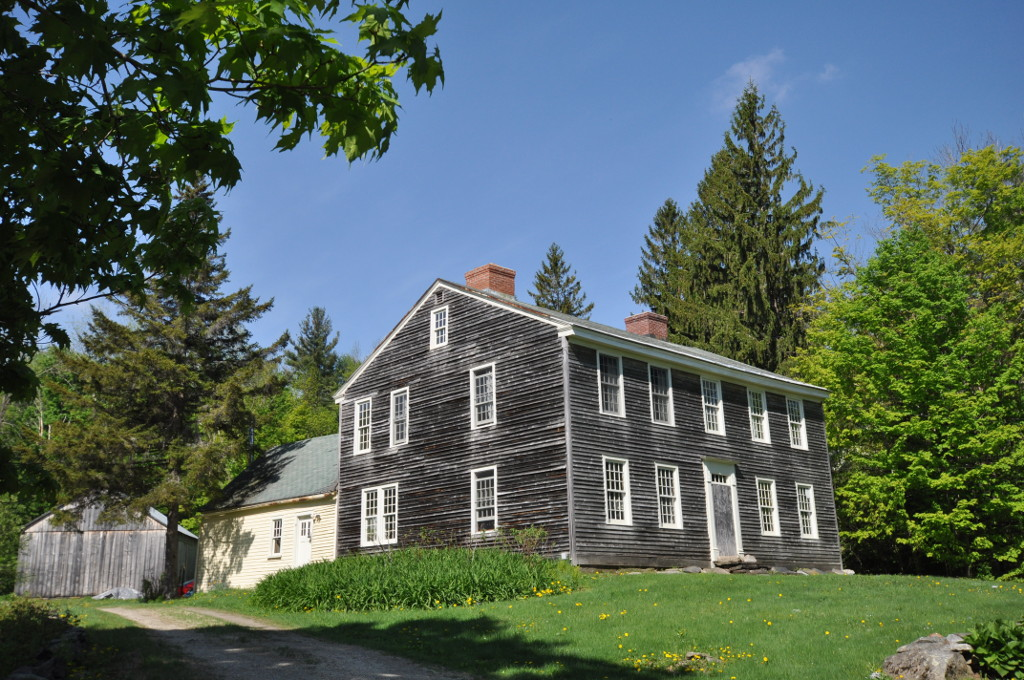
- The Lower Historic District of Washington in 2015

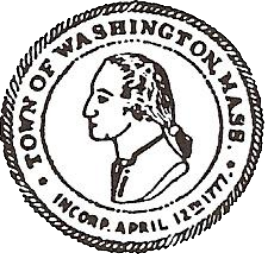
- Seal

- Location in Berkshire County and the state of Massachusetts.
- Coordinates: 42°22′N 73°7′W
- Country: United States
- State: Massachusetts
- County: Berkshire
- Settled: 1760
- Incorporated: 1777

Government
  - Type: Open town meeting

Area
  - Total: 38.8 sq mi (100.5 km^{2})
  - Land: 38.0 sq mi (98.4 km^{2})
  - Water: 0.81 sq mi (2.1 km^{2})
- Elevation: 1,410 ft (430 m)

Population (2020)
  - Total: 494
  - Density: 13.0/sq mi (5.02/km^{2})
- Time zone: UTC-5 (Eastern)
  - Summer (DST): UTC-4 (Eastern)
- ZIP Codes: 01223 (Washington); 01240 (Lenox)
- Area code: 413
- FIPS code: 25-73335
- GNIS feature ID: 618275
- Website: www.washington-ma.gov

Washington is a town in Berkshire County, Massachusetts, United States. It is part of the Pittsfield, Massachusetts, Metropolitan Statistical Area. The population was 494 at the 2020 census.

== History ==
Washington was first settled in 1760 and was officially incorporated in 1777. The town was known by several different names, including Greenoch, Watsontown and Hartville, before being renamed in 1784 for George Washington. The town has always been rural, with few small industries, known more for being along the stage road to Pittsfield and along the rail line later.

== Geography ==
According to the United States Census Bureau, the town has a total area of 38.8 square miles (100.5 km^{2}), of which 38.0 square miles (98.4 km^{2}) is land and 0.81 square miles (2.1 km^{2}), or 2.10%, is water. Located in central Berkshire County along the Hampshire County line, the town, which is roughly shaped, is bordered by Pittsfield to the northwest, Dalton, Hinsdale and Peru to the north, Middlefield to the east, Becket to the southeast, Lee to the southwest, and Lenox to the west. Washington is 39 miles (63 km) northwest of Springfield and 123 miles (198 km) west of Boston.

Washington lies within the Berkshire Hills, and its geography is dominated by Washington Mountain in the western part of town. The mountain, which is surrounded by the October Mountain State Forest, rises to its high plain above the banks of the Housatonic River, falling slowly eastward towards the valley where Depot Brook (which feeds into a branch of the Westfield River) and the east branch of the Housatonic rise. There are several small reservoirs and lakes throughout the town as well. Along the mountain, the Appalachian Trail crosses through town, and the town is home to the Bucksteep Manor Cross Country Ski Area.

Massachusetts Route 8 is the only state route through town, passing from Becket to Hinsdale. The nearest interstate highway, Interstate 90 (the Massachusetts Turnpike), is accessible in neighboring Lee. The town has a rail line, the CSX Berkshire Subdivision, operated by CSX and used by Amtrak. The summit of the Berkshires on the rail line is 0.1 mi north of Summit Hill Road bridge in Washington. The nearest regional airport is Pittsfield Municipal Airport, and the nearest scheduled commercial passenger flights are at Bradley International Airport in Connecticut.

== Demographics ==
Historical population
Year	Pop.	±%
1790	588	—
1850	953	+62.1%
1860	948	−0.5%
1870	694	−26.8%
1880	493	−29.0%
1890	434	−12.0%
1900	377	−13.1%
1910	277	−26.5%
1920	240	−13.4%
1930	222	−7.5%
1940	267	+20.3%
1950	281	+5.2%
1960	290	+3.2%
1970	406	+40.0%
1980	587	+44.6%
1990	615	+4.8%
2000	544	−11.5%
2010	538	−1.1%
2020	494	−8.2%
2024*	497	+0.6%
* = population estimate. Source: United States census records and Population Estimates Program data.

As of the census of 2000, there were 544 people, 203 households, and 163 families residing in the town. The town ranks 28th out of 32 cities and towns in Berkshire County by population, and 340th out of 351 cities and towns in Massachusetts. The population density was 14.4 people per square mile (5.6/km^{2}), ranking it second to last in the county and sixth to last in the state. There were 236 housing units at an average density of 6.2 per square mile (2.4/km^{2}). The racial makeup of the town was 99.45% White, 0.37% African American, and 0.18% from two or more races. Hispanic or Latino of any race were 0.74% of the population.

There were 203 households, out of which 36.5% had children under the age of 18 living with them, 67.0% were married couples living together, 8.4% had a female householder with no husband present, and 19.7% were non-families. 14.8% of all households were made up of individuals, and 6.4% had someone living alone who was 65 years of age or older. The average household size was 2.68 and the average family size was 2.96.

In the town, the population was spread out, with 26.5% under the age of 18, 5.7% from 18 to 24, 25.2% from 25 to 44, 32.7% from 45 to 64, and 9.9% who were 65 years of age or older. The median age was 41 years. For every 100 females, there were 106.1 males. For every 100 females age 18 and over, there were 104.1 males.

The median income for a household in the town was $54,583, and the median income for a family was $55,357. Males had a median income of $40,417 versus $27,143 for females. The per capita income for the town was $23,610. About 4.8% of families and 6.9% of the population were below the poverty line, including 12.5% of those under age 18 and 7.1% of those age 65 or over.

== Government ==
Washington uses the open town meeting form of government, and is led by a board of selectmen. The town has its own police and public works department. Washington has no fire department or public library but relies on both Hinsdale and Becket having facilities. The nearest hospital, Berkshire Medical Center, is in Pittsfield.

On the state level, Washington is represented in the Massachusetts House of Representatives as part of the Second Berkshire district, represented by Paul Mark, which covers central Berkshire County, as well as portions of Hampshire and Franklin counties. In the Massachusetts Senate, the town is part of the Berkshire, Hampshire and Franklin district, represented by Ben Downing, which includes all of Berkshire County and western Hampshire and Franklin counties. The town is patrolled by the Fourth (Cheshire) Station of Barracks "B" of the Massachusetts State Police, and is the southernmost town in that station's patrol area.

On the national level, Washington is represented in the United States House of Representatives as part of Massachusetts's 1st congressional district, and is represented by Richard Neal of Springfield since 2012. Massachusetts is currently represented in the United States Senate by senior Senator Elizabeth Warren and junior Senator Ed Markey.

Washington presidential election results
Year	Democratic	Republican	Third parties	Total Votes	Margin
2020	67.99% 240	30.31% 107	1.70% 6	353	37.68%
2016	66.56% 217	27.30% 89	6.13% 20	326	39.26%
2012	75.63% 239	21.84% 69	2.53% 8	316	53.80%
2008	73.93% 258	23.50% 82	2.58% 9	349	50.43%
2004	66.14% 211	32.60% 104	1.25% 4	319	33.54%
2000	58.50% 179	29.08% 89	12.42% 38	306	29.41%
1996	57.32% 180	21.02% 66	21.66% 68	314	36.31%
1992	42.81% 131	15.69% 48	41.50% 127	306	1.31%
1988	55.33% 135	43.44% 106	1.23% 3	244	11.89%
1984	43.04% 99	55.65% 128	1.30% 3	230	12.61%
1980	32.80% 82	41.20% 103	26.00% 65	250	8.40%
1976	47.68% 113	48.52% 115	3.80% 9	237	0.84%
1972	42.53% 74	57.47% 100	0.00% 0	174	14.94%
1968	44.94% 71	46.84% 74	8.23% 13	158	1.90%
1964	54.93% 78	44.37% 63	0.70% 1	142	10.56%
1960	42.28% 52	57.72% 71	0.00% 0	123	15.45%
1956	29.91% 35	70.09% 82	0.00% 0	117	40.17%
1952	27.05% 33	72.95% 89	0.00% 0	122	45.90%
1948	31.96% 31	68.04% 66	0.00% 0	97	36.08%
1944	45.36% 44	54.64% 53	0.00% 0	97	9.28%
1940	52.78% 57	47.22% 51	0.00% 0	108	5.56%

== Education ==
Washington is one of the seven towns in the Central Berkshire Regional School District, the largest district (by land area) in the Commonwealth. Students in Washington attend the Beckett-Washington Elementary School in neighboring Becket for elementary school. All students in the district travel to Dalton to attend Nessacus Regional Middle School for sixth through eighth grades and Wahconah Regional High School for the high grades. There are no private schools in Washington, with the nearest being in the Pittsfield area.

The nearest community college is Berkshire Community College in Pittsfield. The nearest state colleges are Massachusetts College of Liberal Arts in North Adams and Westfield State University in Westfield, and the nearest state university is the University of Massachusetts Amherst.

== Notable people ==
- Arlo Guthrie, folk singer
- James Taylor, singer-songwriter
