= Peru, Massachusetts =

- Town
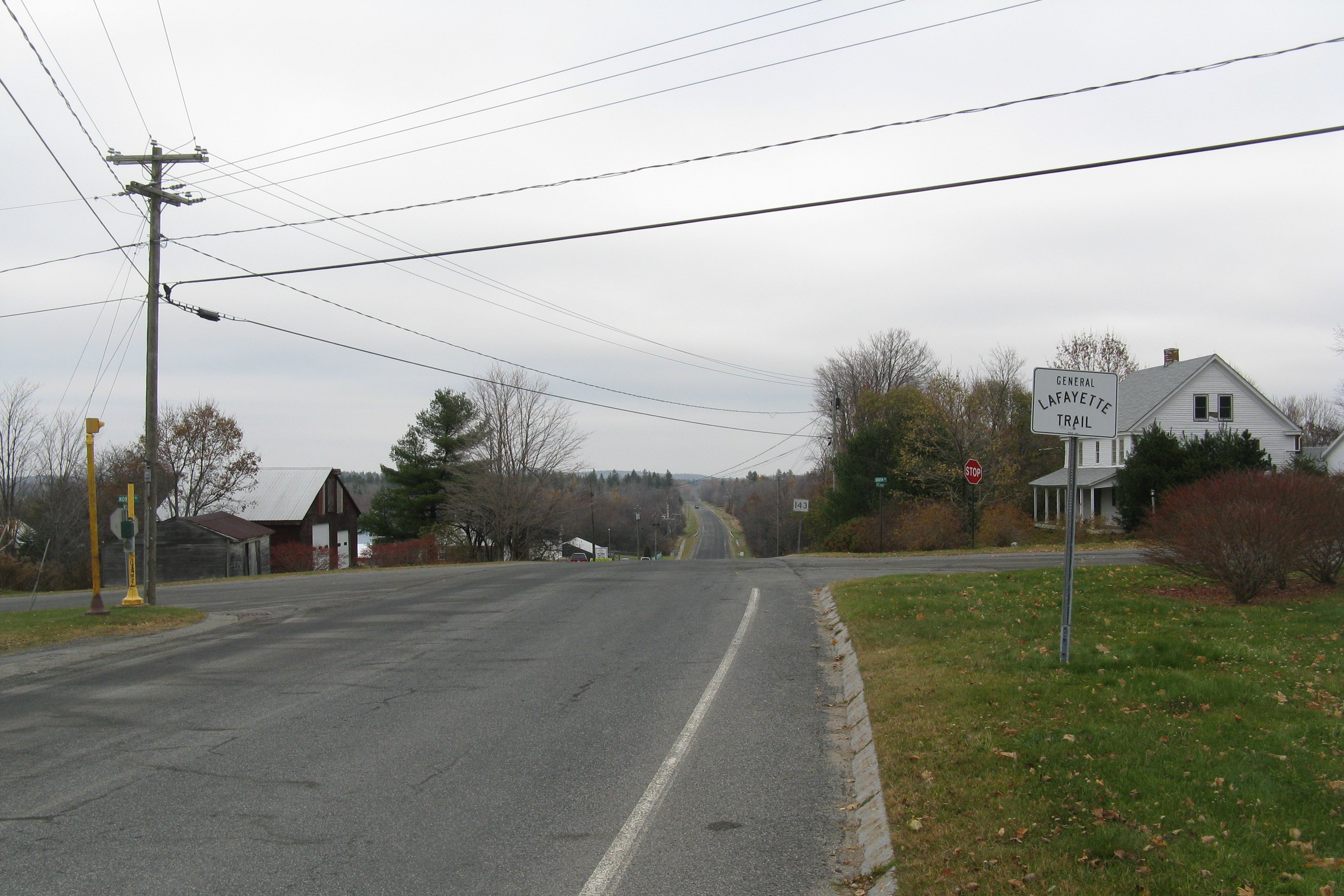
- Peru Center in 2008

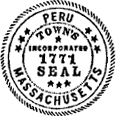
- Seal

- Location in Berkshire County and the state of Massachusetts.
- Coordinates: 42°26′17″N 73°02′47″W
- Country: United States
- State: Massachusetts
- County: Berkshire
- Settled: 1767
- Incorporated: 1771

Government
  - Type: Open town meeting

Area
  - Total: 26.0 sq mi (67.4 km^{2})
  - Land: 25.9 sq mi (67.1 km^{2})
  - Water: 0.12 sq mi (0.3 km^{2})
- Elevation: 2,064 ft (629 m)

Population (2020)
  - Total: 814
  - Density: 31.4/sq mi (12.1/km^{2})
- Time zone: UTC-5 (Eastern)
  - Summer (DST): UTC-4 (Eastern)
- ZIP code: 01235
- Area code: 413
- FIPS code: 25-53050
- GNIS feature ID: 0619423
- Website: www.townofperuma.com

Peru is a town in Berkshire County, Massachusetts, United States. The population was 814 at the 2020 census.

== History ==
Originally known as Northern Berkshire Township Number 2 and including all of Hinsdale and part of Middlefield, the town was first settled in 1767 and was officially incorporated as Partridgefield in 1771. Originally named for Oliver Partridge, one of the three purchasers of the town (along with Governor Francis Bernard), the name was officially changed to Peru in 1806, on the suggestion of the Rev. John Leland, "because it is like the Peru of South America, a mountain town, and if no gold or silver mines are under her rocks, she favors hard money and begins with a P."

On August 15, 1942, Garnet Peak (also known as Garnet Hill) in Peru was the site of a crash of a C-53 "Skytrooper" troop transport plane, resulting in the deaths of 16 of the 19 men on board. The plane was one of 11 transports en route from Pope Field, North Carolina, to Hyannis, Massachusetts, but was diverted after it stopped at Mitchel Field on Long Island to Warwick, Rhode Island because of bad weather. The plane crashed at approximately 9:30 p.m. in low-visibility conditions. A monument listing the names of those killed was installed near the site in 1946 and is still extant.

== Geography ==
According to the United States Census Bureau, the town has a total area of 26.0 square miles (67.4 km^{2}), of which 25.9 square miles (67.1 km^{2}) is land and 0.12 square miles (0.3 km^{2}), or 0.41%, is water. Peru lies on the eastern border of Berkshire County, and is bordered by Windsor to the north, Cummington to the northeast, Worthington to the east, Middlefield to the south, Washington to the southwest, and Hinsdale to the west. Peru is 13 miles (21 km) east of Pittsfield, 40 miles (64 km) northwest of Springfield and 118 miles (190 km) west of Boston.

Peru has the highest mean altitude in Massachusetts and, along with neighboring Windsor, is one of only two municipalities in the state with a mean elevation above 2,000 feet. It lies on high ground in the Berkshire Hills, with three main peaks in the town. Much of Peru is forested, with a large portion of the northern third of town covered by a wildlife management area, and much of the southern third covered by the Peru and Middlefield State Forests. To the west of town, Ashmere Lake flows out into Bennett Brook, eventually reaching the East Branch of the Housatonic River. To the east, many brooks, including Trout Brook, flow south and east towards the Westfield River, part of the Connecticut River watershed (Trout Brook is actually one of the main sources of the river).

Peru is bisected by Massachusetts Route 143, passing from east to west. No other state roads pass through the town. The nearest interstate, Interstate 90 (the Massachusetts Turnpike), can be accessed approximately 20 miles (32 km) away in Lee. The nearest bus stop is in the center of Hinsdale. The nearest coach and rail services can be found in Pittsfield, as can the closest regional airport (at Pittsfield Municipal Airport). The nearest national service is located at Bradley International Airport in Windsor Locks, Connecticut.

== Demographics ==
Historical population
Year	Pop.	±%
1790	1,041	—
1850	519	−50.1%
1860	499	−3.9%
1870	455	−8.8%
1880	403	−11.4%
1890	305	−24.3%
1900	253	−17.0%
1910	237	−6.3%
1920	149	−37.1%
1930	108	−27.5%
1940	142	+31.5%
1950	143	+0.7%
1960	197	+37.8%
1970	256	+29.9%
1980	633	+147.3%
1990	779	+23.1%
2000	821	+5.4%
2010	847	+3.2%
2020	814	−3.9%
2024*	798	−2.0%
* = population estimate. Source: United States census records and Population Estimates Program data.

As of the census of 2000, there were 821 people, 295 households, and 228 families residing in the town. The town is the ninth-smallest of the 32 cities and towns in the county, and ranks 331st out of the 351 cities and towns in Massachusetts by population.

The population density is listed at 31.7 people per square mile (12.2/km^{2}), ranking it 22nd in the county and 328th in the Commonwealth. There were 378 housing units at an average density of 14.6 per square mile (5.6/km^{2}). The racial makeup of the town was 97.93% White, 0.24% African American, 0.12% Native American, 0.49% Asian, 0.12% from other races, and 1.10% from two or more races. Hispanic or Latino of any race were 0.12% of the population.

There were 295 households, out of which 38.0% had children under the age of 18 living with them, 64.7% were married couples living together, 7.5% had a female householder with no husband present, and 22.7% were non-families. 16.3% of all households were made up of individuals, and 5.1% had someone living alone who was 65 years of age or older. The average household size was 2.78 and the average family size was 3.14.

In the town, the population was spread out, with 27.8% under the age of 18, 6.0% from 18 to 24, 31.1% from 25 to 44, 27.4% from 45 to 64, and 7.8% who were 65 years of age or older. The median age was 37 years. For every 100 females, there were 107.3 males. For every 100 females age 18 and over, there were 113.3 males.

The median income for a household in the town was $44,531, and the median income for a family was $51,071. Males had a median income of $35,469 versus $30,625 for females. The per capita income for the town was $18,636. About 4.1% of families and 4.9% of the population were below the poverty line, including 7.3% of those under age 18 and 2.7% of those age 65 or over.

== Government ==
Peru employs the open town meeting form of government, and is led by a board of selectmen. The town has its own services, including police and fire departments, but does not have its own post office (it shares its post office and ZIP code, 01235, with Hinsdale). The town's public library is connected to the regional library system.

On the state level, Peru is represented in the Massachusetts House of Representatives as part of the Second Berkshire district, represented by Paul Mark, which covers central Berkshire County, as well as portions of Hampshire and Franklin Counties. In the Massachusetts Senate, the town is part of the Berkshire, Hampshire and Franklin district, represented by Adam Hinds, which includes all of Berkshire County and western Hampshire and Franklin counties. The town is patrolled by B4 (Cheshire) Barracks of Troop B of the Massachusetts State Police.

On the national level, Peru is represented in the United States House of Representatives as part of Massachusetts's 1st congressional district, and has been represented by Richard Neal of Springfield since 2013. Massachusetts is currently represented in the United States Senate by senior Senator Elizabeth Warren and junior senator Ed Markey.

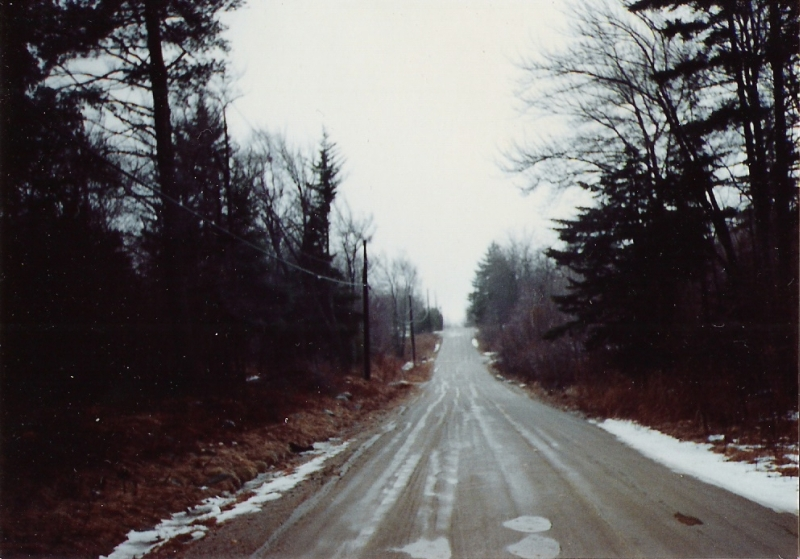
Bonny Lane in Peru

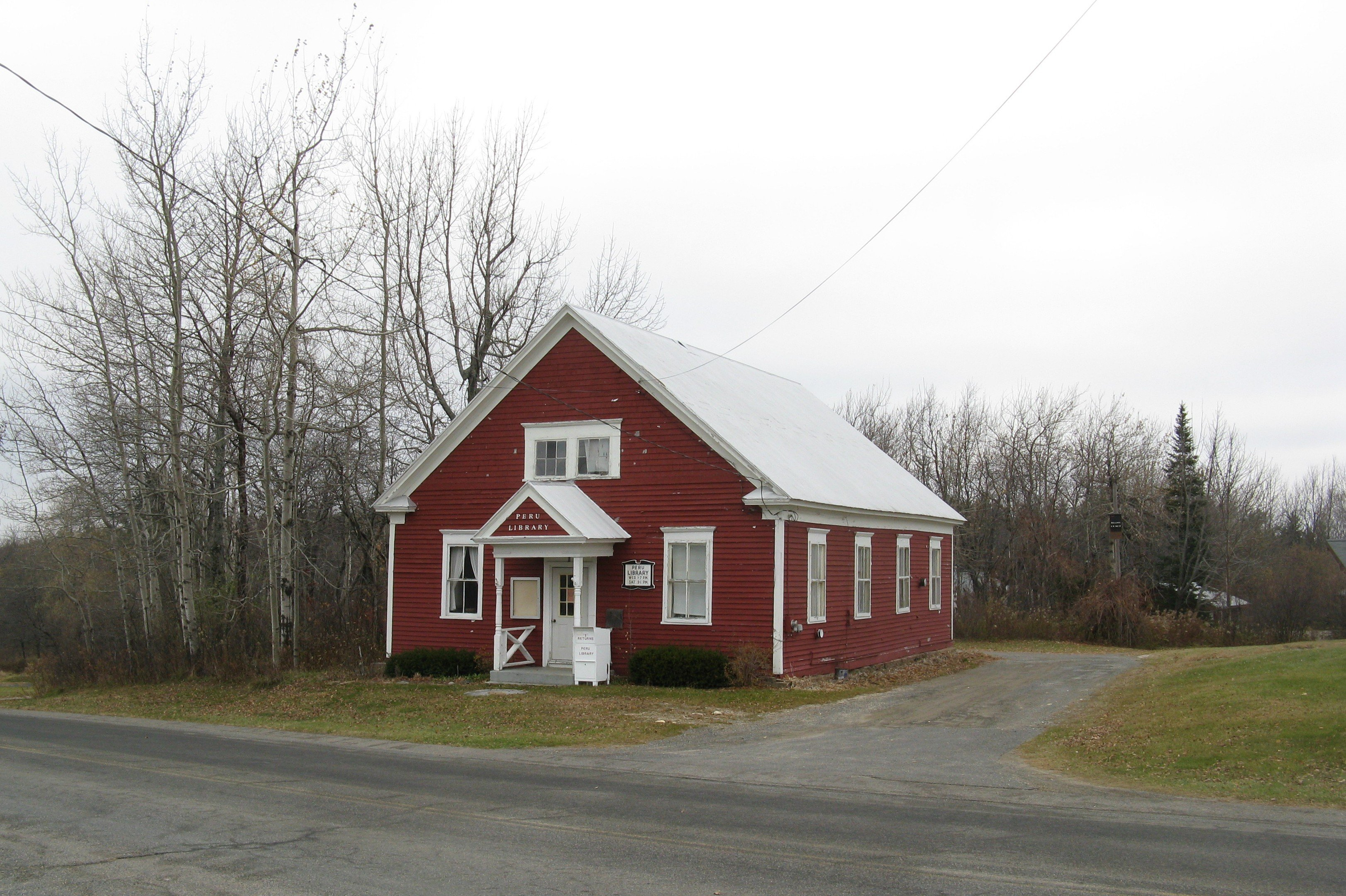
Peru Public Library

== Education ==
Peru is one of the seven towns in the Central Berkshire Regional School District, the largest district (by land area) in the Commonwealth. All students in the district travel to Dalton to attend Nessacus Regional Middle School for sixth through eighth grades and Wahconah Regional High School for the high grades. There are no private schools in Peru, with the nearest being in the Pittsfield area.

The nearest community college is Berkshire Community College in Pittsfield. The nearest state college is Massachusetts College of Liberal Arts in North Adams, and the nearest state university is the University of Massachusetts Amherst.

== Notable people ==
- Amos Dresser (1812–1904), Protestant minister
- Seraph Frissell, M.D., (1840–1915), physician, medical writer
