= Anton Strout =

American writer (1970–2020)

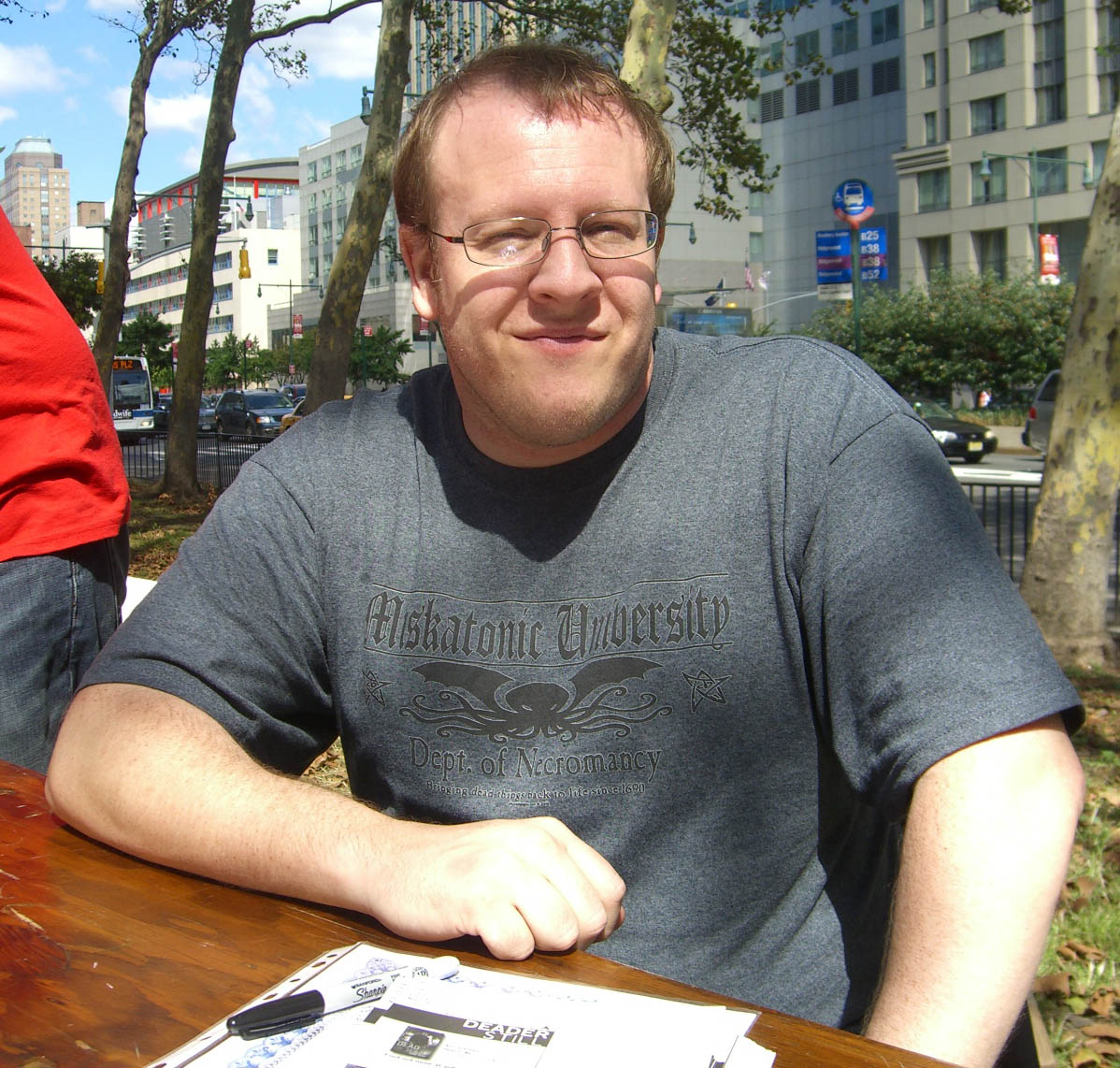
- Strout at the 2009 Brooklyn Book Festival.
- Born: January 24, 1970; Pittsfield, Massachusetts, U.S.
- Died: December 30, 2020 (aged 50)
- Occupation: Author
- Spouse: Orly Trieber Strout
- Children: 2
- Writing career
- Period: 2008–2020
- Genre: Urban fantasy
- Website: www.antonstrout.com

Anton Strout (January 24, 1970 – December 30, 2020) was an American urban fantasy author, blogger, and podcaster.

== Personal life ==
Anton Strout was born on January 24, 1970, in the Berkshires. He was raised in Dalton, Massachusetts, and graduated from Wahconah Regional High School in Massachusetts before majoring in English/Communications and Theater at the North Adams State College, from which he graduated in 1993.

Strout died on December 30, 2020. He was survived by his wife Orly Trieber Strout and two children.

== Career ==
Strout wrote the Simon Canderous series, the first of which, Dead to Me, was published by Ace Books in 2008. Tim Davis, reviewing that title for Bookloons.com, wrote, "Fans of urban fantasy should especially enjoy Strout's engaging new protagonist and will, no doubt, look forward to Simon Canderous making a quick return in further adventures." The second novel, Deader Still, was published in 2009; the third book, Dead Matter, was published in 2010; the fourth book, Dead Waters, was published in 2011.

In addition to his novels, Strout wrote several short stories and maintained both his own blog and participated at the group urban fantasy blog, League of Reluctant Adults.

Strout hosted the Once & Future Podcast in which he interviewed guest authors.

== Bibliography ==
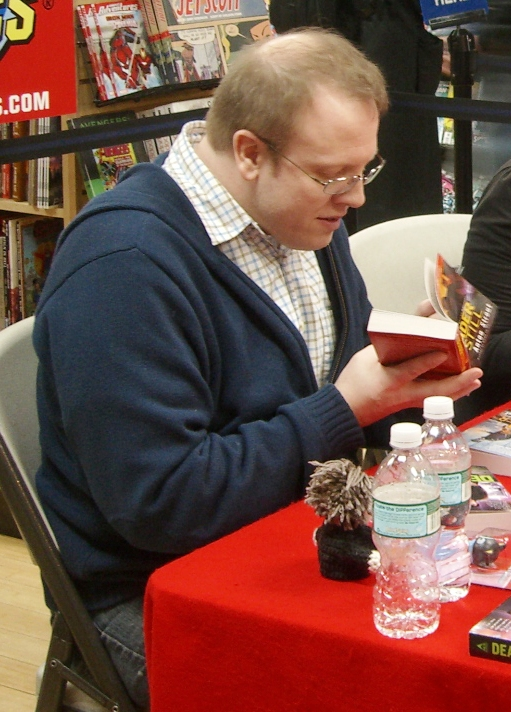
Strout at a signing for Dead Matter at Midtown Comics Times Square in Manhattan, February 27, 2010

=== The Spellmason Chronicles ===
1. Alchemystic (2012)
2. Stonecast (2013)
3. Incarnate (2014)

=== Simon Canderous series ===
1. Dead to Me (2008)
2. Deader Still (2009)
3. Dead Matter (2010)
4. Dead Waters (2011)

=== Anthologies ===
1. "Some Enchanted Evening" in the August 2017 anthology Hath No Fury
2. "Scream" in the February 2015 anthology Blackguards: Tales of Assassins, Mercenaries, & Rogues (a prequel tale of the Simon Canderous universe)
3. "Stay" in the September 2014 anthology Streets of Shadows (part of the Spellmason Chronicles universe, featuring alchemist freelancer Caleb Kennedy)
4. "Hooked" in the March 2012 anthology The Modern Fae's Guide to Surviving Humanity
5. "Lowstone" in the February 2012 anthology Westward Weird
6. "Tumulus" in the December 2011 anthology Human For A Day
7. "Izdu-Bar" in the 2011 anthology After Hours: Tales From The Ur-Bar
8. "Marfa" in the 2011 anthology Boondocks Fantasy
9. "Lupercalia" in the 2010 anthology The Girls' Guide to Guns & Monsters
10. "Stannis" in the 2010 anthology Spells of the City (Note: This story was the basis for the 2012 publication of Alchemystic: Book One of the Spellmason Chronicles)
11. "for lizzie" in the 2009 anthology Zombie Raccoons & Killer Bunnies (part of the Simon Canderous series universe)
12. "The Fourteenth Virtue", in the 2008 anthologyThe Dimension Next Door (part of the Simon Canderous series universe)
13. "Lady In Red", in the 2007 anthology Pandora's Closet
