= Central Berkshire Regional School District =

School district in Massachusetts, United States

Location
- PO Box 299 Dalton, MA Central Berkshire County, Massachusetts United States

District information
- Type: Public
- Grades: K-12
- Established: January 30, 1958
- Superintendent: Dr. Michael Henault
- Budget: USD $37.7 Million

Students and staff
- Students: 1,530
- Teachers: 123.2
- Colors: Blue and White

Other information
- Website: cbrsd.org

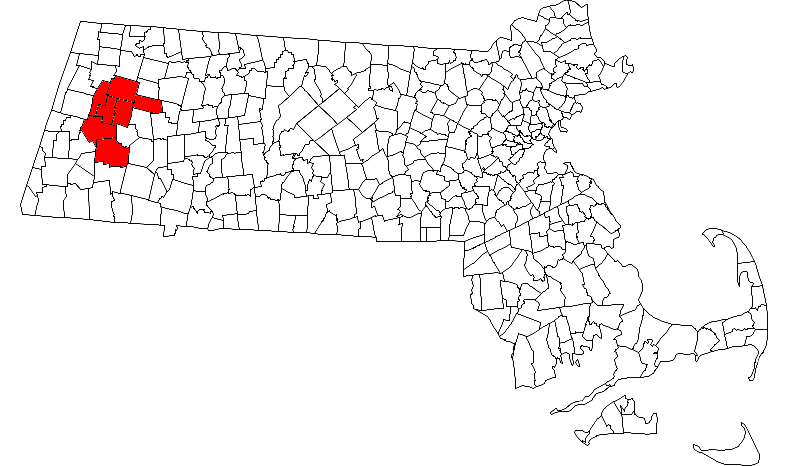
District map

The Central Berkshire Regional School District is the largest school district (by area) in the state of Massachusetts, covering over 214 square miles. It serves seven towns, six in central Berkshire County, Massachusetts; Becket, Dalton, Hinsdale, Peru, Washington, and Windsor; the seventh is the town of Cummington in Hampshire County, Massachusetts . The district has 3 elementary schools: Becket-Washington School (servicing the towns of Becket and Washington), Craneville (servicing the towns of Cummington, Dalton and Windsor), and Kittredge (servicing the towns of Hinsdale and Peru). The district has a regional Middle School (Nessacus) and High School (Wahconah) which are both are located in Dalton and service the entire district.
