= Wahconah Regional High School =

Location
- 150 Old Windsor Rd. Dalton, Massachusetts 01226; United States; 42°28′22.68″N 73°8′23.12″W

Information
- Type: Public; Open enrollment
- Motto: A culture to promote culture
- Opened: 1961
- School district: Central Berkshire
- Superintendent: Laurie Casna
- Principal: Aaron Robb
- Teaching staff: 41.10 (FTE)
- Grades: 9-12
- Enrollment: 450 (2024-2025)
- Student to teacher ratio: 10.95
- Hours in school day: 7 1/2
- Campus size: 25 acres (100,000 m^{2})
- Campus type: Rural
- Colors: Blue and White
- Mascot: Warrior
- Team name: Warriors
- Budget: $28,160,064 total $15,483 per pupil (2016)
- Communities served: Becket, Cummington, Dalton, Hinsdale, Peru, Washington, Windsor
- Website: wahconah.cbrsd.org

Wahconah Regional High School is a high school in Dalton, Massachusetts, United States and is part of the Central Berkshire Regional School District. The school serves the towns of Becket, Cummington, Dalton, Hinsdale, Peru, Washington, and Windsor.

== History ==
Wahconah was a Mahican Indian Princess who the elders wanted to marry a Mohawk warrior. She, however, loved an Algonquian warrior named Nessacus, who risked his life to save her from a bear attack. The matter was to be decided by fate, whereby her canoe would drift to either man standing on opposite banks of the river. However, Wahconah rigged the boat so that it would go toward Nessacus, and they were married.

The Building was built shortly after the creation of the district, and was finished by the start of the 1961 school year. It was originally built to hold about 650 students. During the boom of GE Plastics in Pittsfield, enrollment was as high as 1,300. Accordingly, the building has undergone some expansion, including two portable classrooms and the addition of five classrooms onto one of its corridors.

== Campus ==
Wahconah sits on 25 acres (100,000 m^{2}) of land off Route 8 in Dalton. The old building was shaped like a ladder, with two main corridors that ran north–south, and three hallways that ran east–west. Expansion plans originally called for the addition of a fourth hallway connecting the ends of the hallways, but it proved to be too expensive. There are also soccer fields, baseball diamonds(there was one), and a track/football field. It is one of the few high schools in the region to have both JV and varsity baseball fields on its campus. Trails that run through the woods are used by track and field and cross country running, as well as connect the school to Nessacus Regional Middle School.

On April 6, 2019, the citizens of the seven towns that are serviced by the Central Berkshire School District narrowly approved the $70 million project to build a new Wahconah High by 88 votes (1,785 votes in favor and 1,697 against). It is expected to open in the fall of 2021.

== Curriculum ==
Courses of Study at WRHS include Math, Science, English, and Social Studies. Business courses and tech classes are also offered. In the 2006–2007 school year, Wahconah became part of VHS, in which schools provide a teacher to teach online courses in exchange for the ability for 25 students to take other online classes.

== Notable alumni ==
- Anton Strout - urban fantasy novelist
- Jeff Reardon - Major League Baseball pitcher, 1979–1994. At one time Major League Baseball's all-time pitching saves leader, now ranked tenth
- Turk Wendell - Major League Baseball pitcher, 1993–2004.
