= Jeff Reardon =

American baseball player (born 1955)

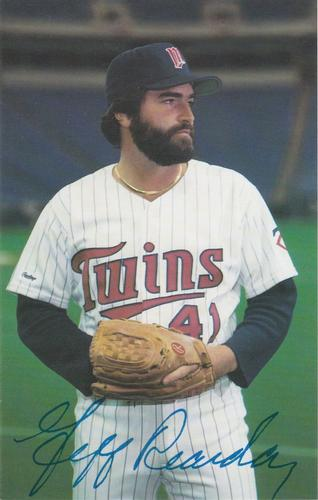
- Reardon with the Minnesota Twins in 1987
- Pitcher
- Born: October 1, 1955 (age 70); Pittsfield, Massachusetts, U.S.
- Batted: Right Threw: Right

MLB debut
- August 25, 1979, for the New York Mets

Last MLB appearance
- May 4, 1994, for the New York Yankees

MLB statistics
- Win–loss record: 73–77
- Earned run average: 3.16
- Strikeouts: 877
- Saves: 367
- Stats at Baseball Reference

Teams
- New York Mets (1979–1981); Montreal Expos (1981–1986); Minnesota Twins (1987–1989); Boston Red Sox (1990–1992); Atlanta Braves (1992); Cincinnati Reds (1993); New York Yankees (1994)

Career highlights and awards
- 4× All-Star (1985, 1986, 1988, 1991); World Series champion (1987); NL Rolaids Relief Man Award (1985); NL saves leader (1985); Montreal Expos Hall of Fame

Jeffrey James Reardon (born October 1, 1955) is an American former professional baseball relief pitcher who played in Major League Baseball (MLB) from 1979–1994 with the New York Mets, Montreal Expos, Minnesota Twins, Boston Red Sox, Atlanta Braves, Cincinnati Reds, and New York Yankees. Reardon was nicknamed "the Terminator" for his intimidating presence on the mound and 98 mph fastball. A long-time closer, Reardon became MLB's all-time saves leader in 1992 with his 342nd save, breaking Rollie Fingers' previous record of 341. Reardon's record was broken the following season by Lee Smith. Reardon currently ranks 12th on the all-time saves list with 367.

== Career ==
After graduation in 1973 from Wahconah Regional High School in Dalton, Massachusetts, Reardon was drafted by the Montreal Expos in the 23rd round of the 1973 amateur draft, but did not sign. Reardon played college baseball for the University of Massachusetts Amherst. While at UMass, he played collegiate summer baseball for three years (1974–1976) with the Cotuit Kettleers of the Cape Cod Baseball League, and in 2000 was named a member of the inaugural class of the Cape Cod Baseball League Hall of Fame. After college, Reardon went undrafted and signed a minor league contract with the New York Mets in 1977, and was assigned to the Lynchburg Mets in the Single-A Carolina League. Although undrafted, Reardon quickly made his way through the Mets' farm system, compiling a 30–9 record with a 2.68 ERA and 6 saves in 74 games combined between Lynchburg, Jackson in 1978, and Tidewater in 1979.

Reardon made his Major League debut with the Mets on August 25, 1979, and would stay in the majors for the rest of his career. He pitched for the Mets until midway through the 1981 season, working mostly as a middle reliever, when he was traded to the Montreal Expos along with outfielder Dan Norman for Ellis Valentine. Lacking a reliable closer on the big league staff, the Expos immediately turned Reardon loose in the ninth inning, and he responded by saving 146 games from 1982 to 1986.

When with the Expos, Reardon suffered streaks of inconsistency, occasionally blowing two or three save opportunities in a row. During one bad streak in 1983, Montreal players' wives were invited to appear on the field, and the Expos' fans at Olympic Stadium booed his wife.

During his time in Montreal, Reardon was named to the All-Star team twice (1985–1986), and led the majors in saves during the 1985 season, earning the Rolaids Relief Man of the Year Award.

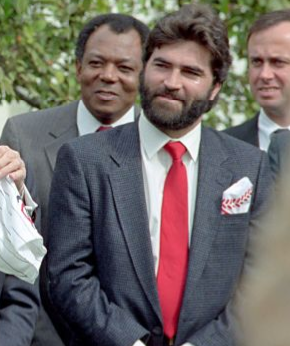
Reardon (center) at the White House in 1987

Prior to the start of the 1987 season, Reardon was again traded—this time to the Minnesota Twins along with catcher Tom Nieto—for pitchers Neal Heaton, Yorkis Pérez, and Alfredo Cardwood and catcher Jeff Reed. Although his performance dropped compared to his previous five seasons, the trade would immediately pay dividends for the team as he would help the Twins win the 1987 World Series. The next season, he reverted to form, was named to his third All-Star team, and became the first pitcher in Major League Baseball history to have 40-save seasons in both the American and National Leagues. After another good season in 1989, Reardon became a free agent and signed with the Boston Red Sox on December 6. In honor of Reardon's signing, his birthplace of Dalton, Massachusetts, named its athletic field after him. After saving only 21 games for the Red Sox in 1990, Reardon was named to his fourth and final All-Star team in 1991 after another 40-save season. He broke Rollie Fingers' all-time saves record in 1992 with his 342nd save. Later that season, he was traded to the Atlanta Braves for starting pitcher Nate Minchey and minor league outfielder Sean Ross. With the Braves, he pitched in his second World Series and was responsible for two of Atlanta's four losses versus Toronto, blowing a save in Game 2 and giving up the winning hit in Game 3.

Following the 1992 season, Reardon signed as a free agent with the Cincinnati Reds. However, his days of closing were over; he worked as the setup man to Rob Dibble. Reardon finished the 1993 season with his highest ERA (4.09) since 1987 and his fewest saves (8) since 1981. Granted free agency, Reardon signed with the New York Yankees on February 15, 1994. Although he went north with the team, Reardon retired on May 4, 1994, after compiling an 8.38 ERA while allowing 17 hits over 9 2/3 innings in 11 games. After his 16-year career, Reardon stood second on the all-time saves list (to Lee Smith), finishing with more saves (367) than walks (358) and was the only reliever to have more than 20 saves every year from 1982 to 1988.

== Post career ==
After the end of his career, Reardon retired to Palm Beach Gardens, Florida at PGA National Golf Club with his wife, Phebe, and three children, Jay, Shane, and Kristi, turning down offers to coach in order to spend time with his family. Other than appearing as a corporate sponsor and speaker for Lerner Sports Marketing, Reardon's retirement was uneventful.

On February 21, 2004, Reardon's son, Shane—who had long struggled with drugs and had been sent to the Academy at Swift River, a therapeutic boarding school in Massachusetts for his senior year in high school—died of a drug overdose at the age of 20. Following his son's death, Reardon spiraled into depression, even trying to take his life, before seeking psychiatric help. Following a one-week stay in a clinic, Reardon was prescribed a half-dozen antidepressant and antipsychotic medications. Just before Christmas 2005, Reardon was diagnosed with a blocked artery in his heart, which required insertion of a heart stent, being the second Reardon had needed. Following surgery, Reardon developed a urinary-tract infection, requiring more medications. By this time, he was taking more than a dozen separate prescriptions, one of which was Levaquin, which is known to have side effects such as paranoia, anxiety and depression—further exacerbating his pre-existing conditions.

On December 26, 2005, Reardon was taken into custody in the parking area and charged by the Palm Beach Gardens, Florida Police Department for allegedly committing armed robbery at a Hamilton Jewelers store inside The Gardens Mall. Reardon attributed his actions to the influence of the medications which he had been taking since his son died in 2004. Soon after the episode at the mall and his release from an overnight stay in jail, Reardon returned to a psychiatric facility, and was an inpatient for nearly two months. At that time, his doctors drastically reduced his medications and began to administer electroshock treatments. However, Reardon still had to stand trial.

Reardon was found not guilty of the charges by reason of drug-induced insanity. The judge ruled because Reardon had been taking anti-depressants and mood stabilizers, and he was distraught over his son's death, there was no reasonable explanation for the robbery. In addition, Reardon was not required to be committed after the ruling.

After the death of their son, the Reardons established a foundation in Shane's name dedicated to helping those struggling with addiction.

== See also ==
- List of Major League Baseball annual saves leaders
- List of Major League Baseball career games finished leaders
- List of Major League Baseball career saves leaders

Achievements
Preceded by Rollie Fingers	All-Time Saves Leader; 1992-1993	Succeeded by Lee Smith
