= Dalton, Massachusetts =

- Town
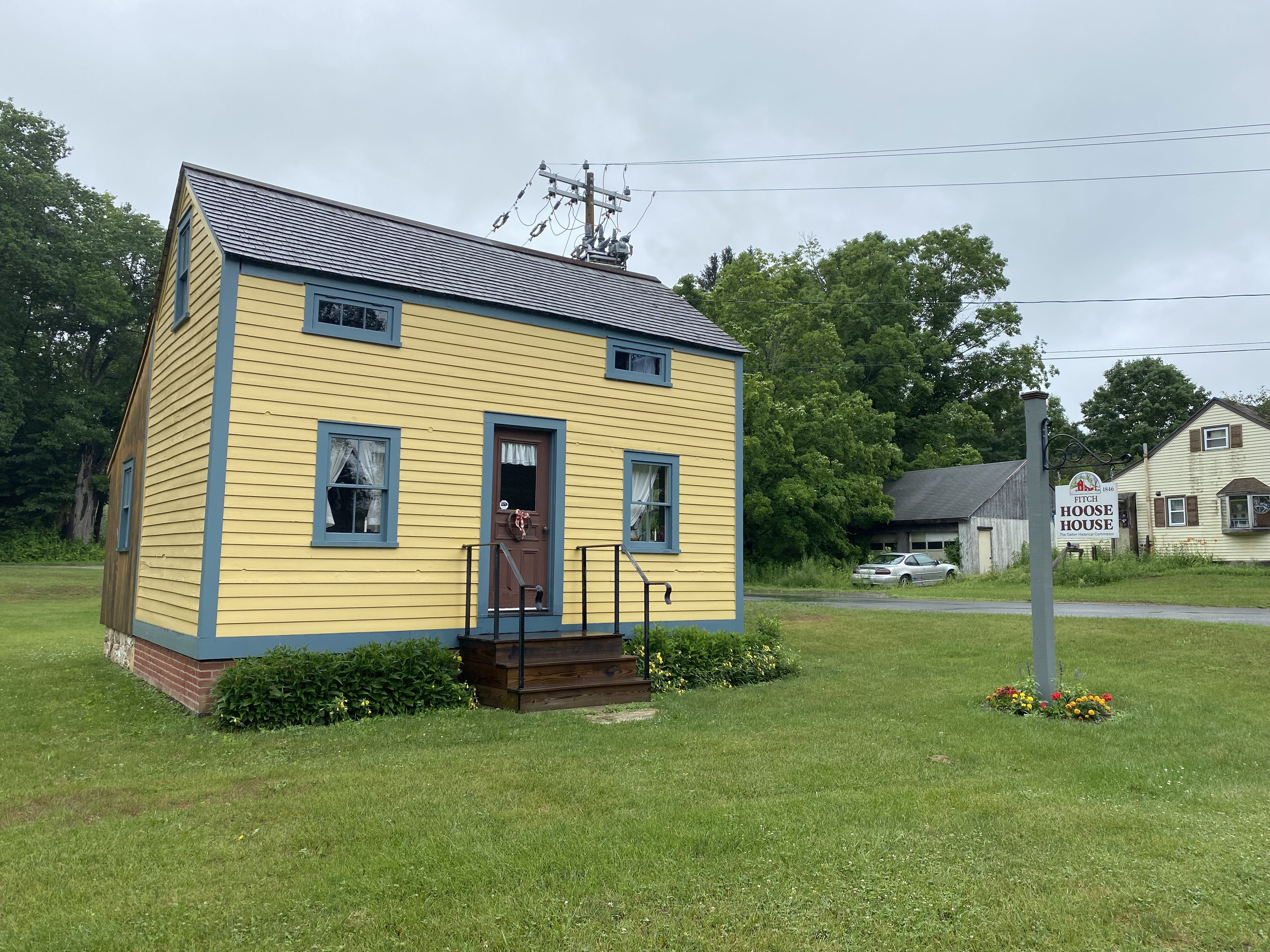
- The Fitch–Hoose House in 2021

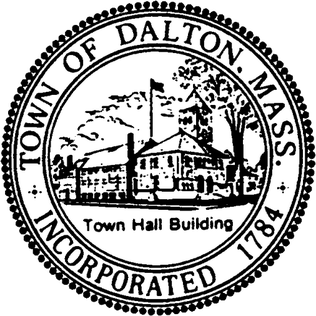
- Seal
- Motto: "Heaven in the heart of the Berkshires"
- Location in Berkshire County and the state of Massachusetts.

- Location within the contiguous United States of America
- Coordinates: 42°28′25″N 73°10′00″W
- Country: United States
- State: Massachusetts
- County: Berkshire
- Settled: 1755
- Incorporated: 1784
- Named for: Tristram Dalton

Government
  - Type: Open town meeting

Area
  - Total: 21.9 sq mi (56.7 km^{2})
  - Land: 21.8 sq mi (56.4 km^{2})
  - Water: 0.12 sq mi (0.3 km^{2})
- Elevation: 1,198 ft (365 m)

Population (2020)
  - Total: 6,330
  - Density: 291/sq mi (112/km^{2})
  - Demonym: Daltonian
- Time zone: UTC−5 (Eastern)
  - Summer (DST): UTC−4 (Eastern)
- ZIP Code: 01227
- Area code: 413
- FIPS code: 25-16180
- GNIS feature ID: 0619418
- Website: dalton-ma.gov

Dalton is a town in Berkshire County, Massachusetts, United States. Dalton is a transition town between the urban and rural portions of Berkshire County. It is part of the Pittsfield, Massachusetts Metropolitan Statistical Area. The population was 6,330 at the 2020 census.

== History ==
Dalton was first settled in 1755 on former Equivalent Lands, and officially incorporated in 1784. The town was named after Tristram Dalton, the Speaker of the Massachusetts House of Representatives at the time of the town's incorporation.

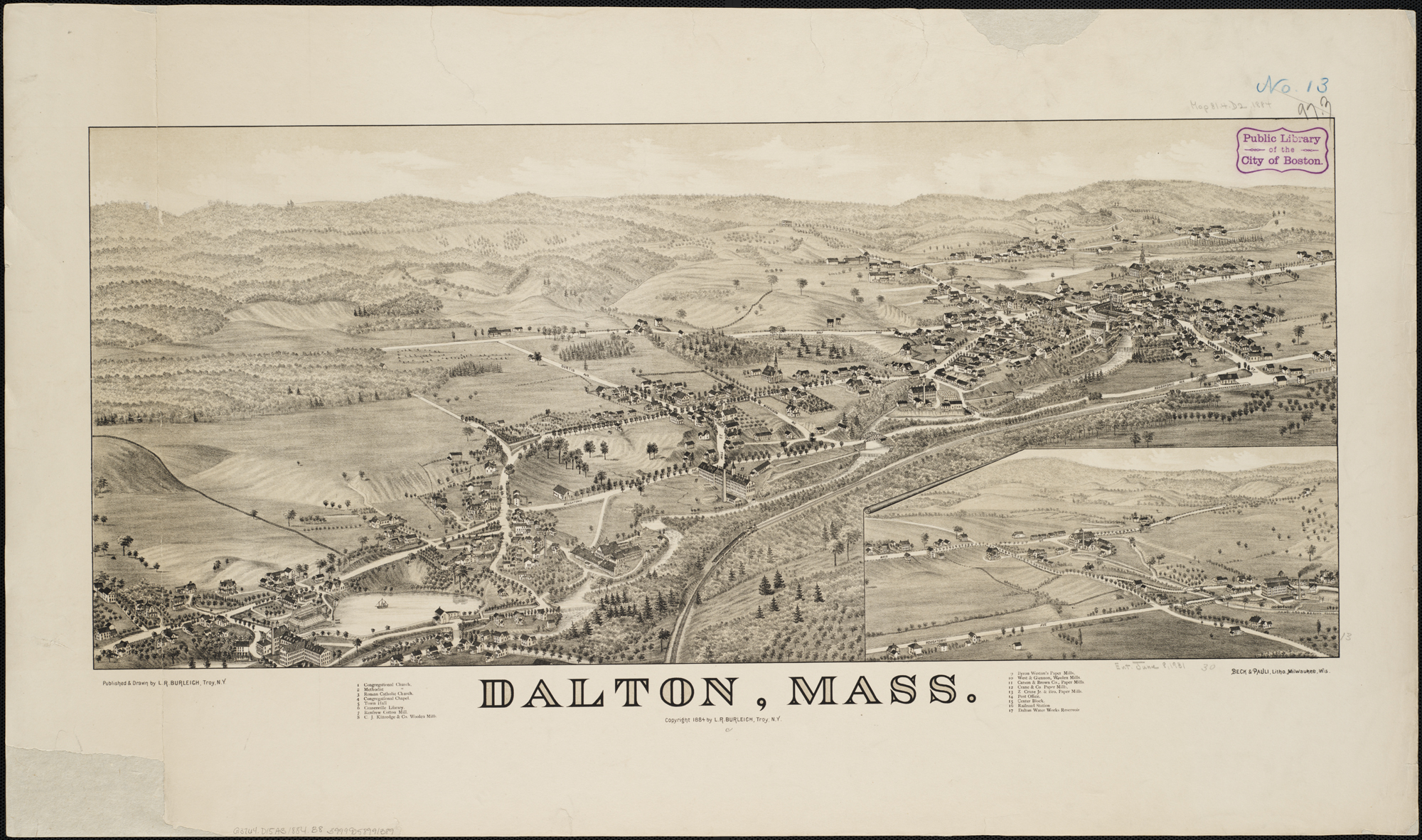
Lithograph of Dalton from 1884 by L.R. Burleigh with list of landmarks

Dalton was settled as a rural-industrial community, with mills set up along the East Branch of the Housatonic River and small patches of farmland in other areas. In 1801, Zenas Crane, Henry Wiswall and John Willard set up a paper mill along the river which, by 1844, had begun producing banknote paper, which was purchased by banks all the way to Boston. The company, Crane & Co., still is the largest employer in town, making paper products, stationery, and, since 1873, has been the only supplier of paper for the Federal Reserve Note, the United States' paper money. The town now has a mix of small town and suburban qualities, and was served by trolleys to Pittsfield for many years.

In 1973, Dalton was the host of the International Six Days Enduro (ISDE or ISDT), also referred to as "The Olympics of Motorcycling". The ISDE is an annual event held in a different country each year since 1913 (minus WWI and WWII), and draws competitors from all around the world.

== Geography ==
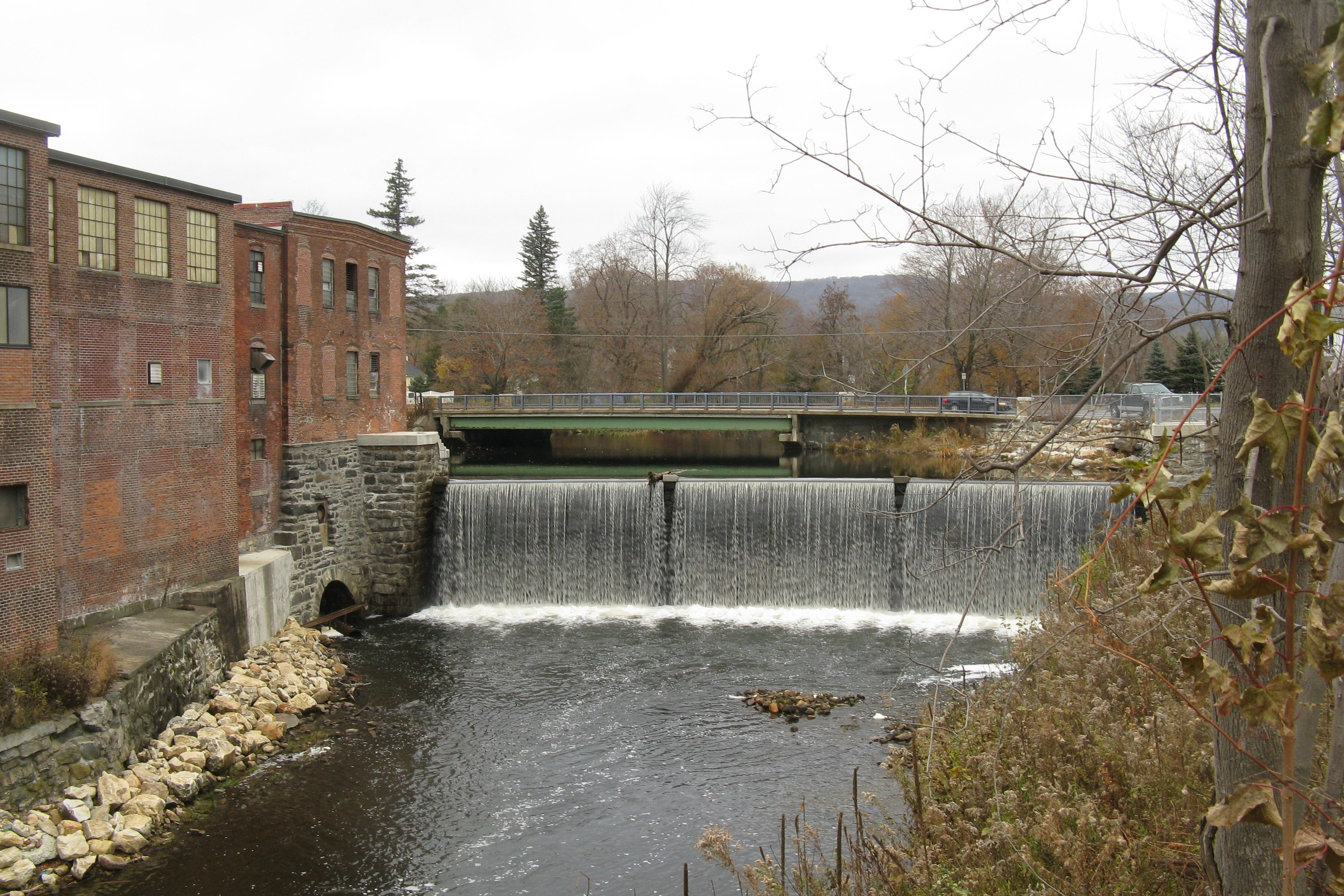
East branch of the Housatonic River, Main Street and Depot Street, 2008.

According to the United States Census Bureau, the town has a total area of 21.9 square miles (56.7 km^{2}), of which 21.8 square miles (56.4 km^{2}) is land and 0.12 square miles (0.3 km^{2}), or 0.45%, is water. Dalton is bordered by Cheshire to the northwest and north, Windsor to the northeast, Hinsdale to the east, Washington to the south, and Pittsfield and Lanesborough to the west. The town center is 5 miles (8 km) northeast of downtown Pittsfield, 45 miles (72 km) northwest of Springfield, and 140 miles (230 km) west of Boston.

Dalton's center of population, due to its milling history, is around the valley of the East Branch of the Housatonic River. Several brooks empty into the river, including Wahconah Falls Brook, whose eponymous waterfalls are a small state park. Much of the rest of town is dominated by the Berkshires, with the north being on a plateau between the peaks of North Mountain and Western Mountain, covered by the Dalton Wildlife Management Area. The south is dominated by Tully Mountain, whose peak is just over the Hinsdale line. The Appalachian Trail winds through town, passing between Tully and North Mountains through the downtown area.

== Transportation ==
Dalton lies at the junction of Massachusetts Route 8, Route 8A and Route 9, with the latter two running concurrently. Route 9 is the major central east-west route through the state, and ends in neighboring Pittsfield. Dalton's nearest interstate is Interstate 90, the Massachusetts Turnpike, whose nearest exit is 15 miles (24 km) south of town. The Berkshire Regional Transit Authority provides bus service. The rail line, owned by CSX Transportation, hosts freight and Amtrak's Lake Shore Limited with a station stop in Pittsfield. The nearest regional air service can be found at Pittsfield Municipal Airport, and the nearest national air service can be found at Albany International Airport.

== Demographics ==
Historical population
Year	Pop.	±%
1790	554	—
1850	1,020	+84.1%
1860	1,243	+21.9%
1870	1,252	+0.7%
1880	2,052	+63.9%
1890	2,885	+40.6%
1900	3,014	+4.5%
1910	3,568	+18.4%
1920	3,752	+5.2%
1930	4,220	+12.5%
1940	4,206	−0.3%
1950	4,772	+13.5%
1960	6,436	+34.9%
1970	7,505	+16.6%
1980	6,797	−9.4%
1990	7,155	+5.3%
2000	6,892	−3.7%
2010	6,756	−2.0%
2020	6,330	−6.3%
2022*	6,236	−1.5%
* = Population estimate. Source: United States census records and Population Estimates Program data.

As of the census of 2000, there were 6,892 people, 2,712 households, and 1,857 families residing in the town. By population, Dalton ranks sixth out of the 32 cities and towns in Berkshire County, and 217th out of the 351 cities and towns in Massachusetts. The population density was 316.0 inhabitants per square mile (122.0/km^{2}), which ranks 4th in the county and 210th in the Commonwealth. There were 2,832 housing units at an average density of 129.8 per square mile (50.1/km^{2}). The racial makeup of the town was 97.78% White, 0.51% African American, 0.12% Native American, 0.71% Asian, 0.44% from other races, and 0.45% from two or more races. Hispanic or Latino of any race were 1.02% of the population.

There were 2,712 households, out of which 32.2% had children under the age of 18 living with them, 54.5% were married couples living together, 10.9% had a female householder with no husband present, and 31.5% were non-families. Of all households, 26.9% were made up of individuals, and 12.5% had someone living alone who was 65 years of age or older. The average household size was 2.50 and the average family size was 3.04.

In the town, the population was spread out, with 25.8% under the age of 18, 6.1% from 18 to 24, 26.2% from 25 to 44, 25.2% from 45 to 64, and 16.7% who were 65 years of age or older. The median age was 40 years. For every 100 females, there were 91.5 males. For every 100 females age 18 and over, there were 85.5 males.

The median income for a household in the town was $47,891, and the median income for a family was $59,717. Males had a median income of $41,379 versus $28,885 for females. The per capita income for the town was $23,634. About 1.2% of families and 2.7% of the population were below the poverty line, including 1.5% of those under age 18 and 7.1% of those age 65 or over.

The town has churches for several different Christian denominations, including a Congregational church, a Roman Catholic Church, a Methodist Church, an Episcopal church and a Church of the Nazarene.

== Government ==
Dalton uses the open town meeting form of government, and is led by a board of selectmen and a town manager. Dalton has its own police, fire district, ambulance, and public works departments. The town's public library, located adjacent to the town hall, is a member of the regional library network. The nearest hospital, Berkshire Medical Center, is in neighboring Pittsfield.

On the state level, Dalton is represented in the Massachusetts House of Representatives as part of the Second Berkshire district, represented by Paul Mark, which covers towns in Berkshire County, Hampshire County, and Franklin County. In the Massachusetts Senate, the town is part of the Berkshire, Hampshire and Franklin district, which includes all of Berkshire County and western Hampshire and Franklin counties.

On the national level, Dalton is represented in the United States House of Representatives as part of Massachusetts's 1st congressional district. MA-01 is represented by Richard Neal of Springfield, Massachusetts.

The town is patrolled by the Fourth (Cheshire) Station of Barracks "B" of the Massachusetts State Police.

== Education ==
Dalton is the town with the highest population in the Central Berkshire Regional School District. Craneville Elementary School serves Dalton students from kindergarten through fifth grade. Nessacus Regional Middle School, in Dalton, serves all middle school students in the district, and Wahconah Regional High School is the district's high school, also located in Dalton. The athletic teams are nicknamed the Warriors, and their colors are blue and white.

The town also has a parochial school, Saint Agnes Academy, which serves students from pre-kindergarten through eighth grades. There are other private and parochial schools in neighboring Pittsfield, including a Catholic high school.

The nearest community college, Berkshire Community College, is located in Pittsfield. The nearest state college is Massachusetts College of Liberal Arts in North Adams, the nearest state university is the University of Massachusetts Amherst, and the nearest private college is Williams College in Williamstown.

Dalton gave its name to the Dalton Plan educational concept and the Dalton School (see Helen Parkhurst).

== Notable people ==
- Dan Duquette, former Boston Red Sox, Baltimore Orioles and Montreal Expos general manager
- Mary Cutler Fairchild (1855–1921), librarian and library educator
- Mary Ann Glendon, law professor, United States Ambassador to the Holy See
- Jeff Reardon, 16-year Major League Baseball veteran who spent three seasons (1990–1992) with the Boston Red Sox
- Anton Strout, USA Today bestselling fantasy and science fiction author, host of The Once and Future Podcast
- David H. Tower, paper mill architect who designed many of Crane's first mills used to fill orders for the Bureau of Engraving and Printing, best known doing business with his brother under the firm D. H. & A. B. Tower
- Turk Wendell, former Major League Baseball pitcher

== See also ==
- List of mill towns in Massachusetts
- List of municipalities in Massachusetts
- National Register of Historic Places listings in Berkshire County, Massachusetts
