= Pittsfield Municipal Airport (Massachusetts) =

Airport in Massachusetts, United States

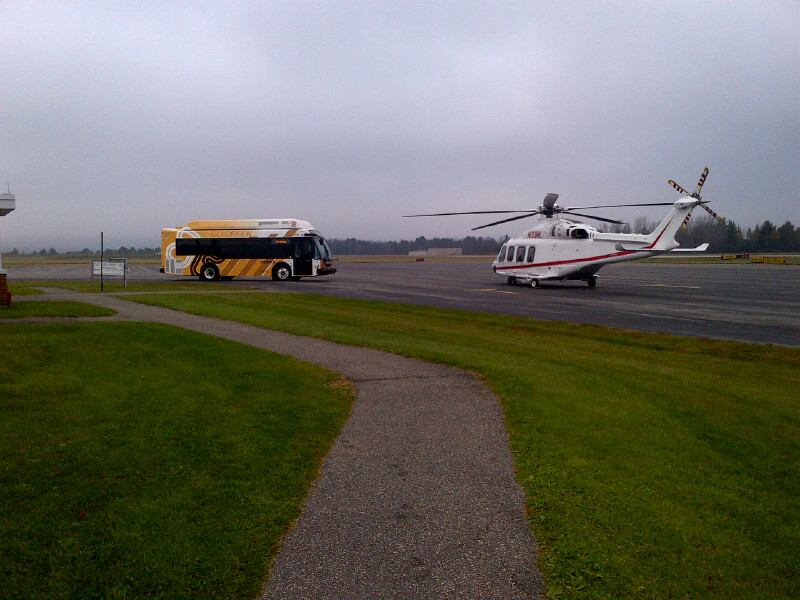
- IATA: PSF; ICAO: KPSF; FAA LID: PSF

Summary
- Airport type: Public
- Owner: City of Pittsfield
- Serves: Pittsfield, Massachusetts
- Elevation AMSL: 1,194 ft (364 m)
- Coordinates: 42°25′37″N 073°17′34″W
- Website: cityofpittsfield.org

Map
- Interactive map of Pittsfield Municipal Airport

Runways
Direction	Length		Surface
Direction	ft	m	Surface
8/26	5,790	1,765	Asphalt
14/32	3,496	1,066	Asphalt

Statistics (2012)
- Aircraft operations: 33,000
- Based aircraft: 37
- Source: Federal Aviation Administration

Pittsfield Municipal Airport (IATA: PSF, ICAO: KPSF, FAA LID: PSF) is two miles west of Pittsfield, in Berkshire County, Massachusetts. The National Plan of Integrated Airport Systems for 2011–2015 categorized it as a general aviation facility.

The first airline flights were Mohawk DC-3s, 1953 to 1958; Northeast DC-3s stopped at Pittsfield 1953-54 to 1962. Flights on commuter airlines like Command Airways and Precision Airlines lasted until 1983-84; Precision flew to Rutland, Vermont and New York City LaGuardia Airport.

== Facilities ==
The airport covers 550 acres (223 ha) at an elevation of 1,194 feet (364 m). It has two asphalt runways: 8/26 is 5,790 by 100 feet (1,765 x 30 m) and 14/32 is 3,496 by 100 feet (1,066 x 30 m).

In the year ending August 22, 2012 the airport had 33,000 aircraft operations, average 90 per day: 88% general aviation, 11% air taxi, and 1% military. 37 aircraft were then based at the airport: 76% single-engine, 13% multi-engine, and 11% jet.

== See also ==
- List of airports in Massachusetts
