= Senator Ely =

Senator Ely may refer to:

- Frederick D. Ely (1838–1921), Massachusetts State Senate
- John Ely (Iowa politician) (1919–2007), Iowa State Senate
- Ralph Ely (1820–1883), Michigan State Senate
- Richard Ely (Nebraska politician) (1921–2017), Nebraska State Senate
- Smith Ely Jr. (1825–1911), New York State Senate
- Sumner Ely (1787–1857), New York State Senate
- Townsend A. Ely (1843–1928), Michigan State Senate
- William H. J. Ely (1891–1942), New Jersey State Senate
