= Hinsdale, Massachusetts =

- Town
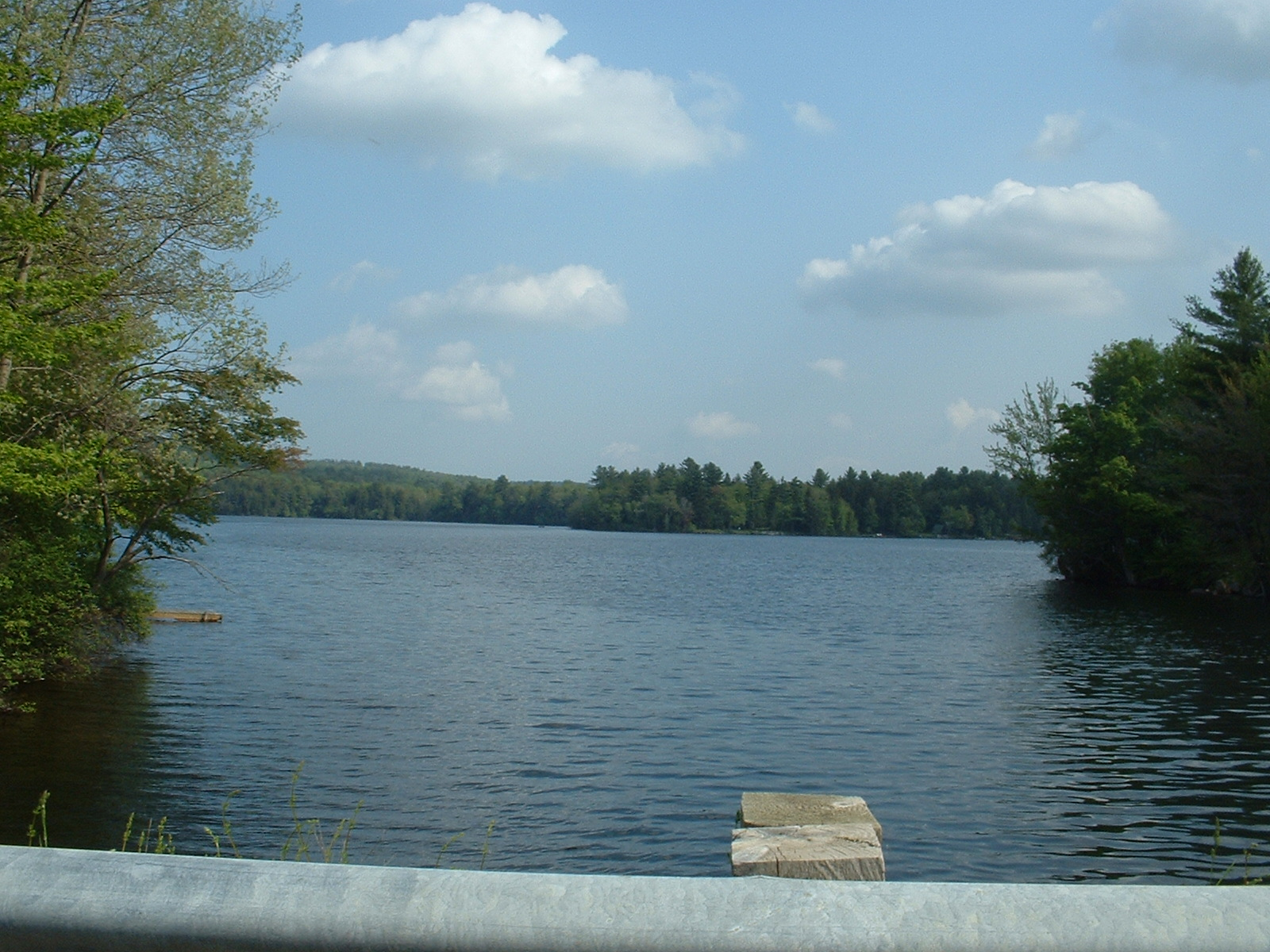
- Ashmere Lake from Rte. 143, looking north

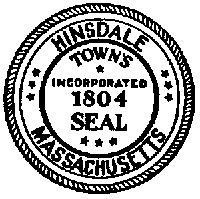
- Seal

- Location in Berkshire County and the state of Massachusetts.
- Coordinates: 42°26′19″N 73°07′33″W
- Country: United States
- State: Massachusetts
- County: Berkshire
- Settled: 1763
- Incorporated: 1804

Government
  - Type: Open town meeting

Area
  - Total: 21.7 sq mi (56.2 km^{2})
  - Land: 20.7 sq mi (53.7 km^{2})
  - Water: 0.97 sq mi (2.5 km^{2})
- Elevation: 1,440 ft (440 m)

Population (2020)
  - Total: 1,919
  - Density: 92.6/sq mi (35.7/km^{2})
- Time zone: UTC−5 (Eastern)
  - Summer (DST): UTC−4 (Eastern)
- ZIP Code: 01235
- Area code: 413
- FIPS code: 25-30315
- GNIS feature ID: 618266
- Website: www.hinsdalemass.com

Hinsdale is a town in Berkshire County, Massachusetts, United States. It is part of the Metropolitan Statistical Area of Pittsfield, Massachusetts. The population was 1,919 at the 2020 census.

== History ==
Originally part of Northern Berkshire Township Number 2 and including all of Peru and parts of Middlefield and Dalton, the town was first settled in 1763 and officially incorporated as "Partridgefield" in 1771. Named for Oliver Partridge, one of the three purchasers of the town (along with Governor Francis Bernard), the Western Parish officially broke away from its eastern half and incorporated in 1804, renaming itself for the family of Rev. Theodore Hinsdale, who also owned an important woolen mill. The mill was the center of economic activity in town until the Great Depression, when it closed.

Hinsdale, along with neighboring Dalton, is home to two historic long-distance routes: the Appalachian Trail (a National Scenic Trail) and the Boston and Albany Railroad, on which operates the Lake Shore Limited passenger rail service that has run continuously from Boston to Chicago since 1897. The Hinsdale train depot located in the town center was closed in 1954, and the actual intersection of the two corridors lies at the also decommissioned train depot just north in Dalton.

== Geography ==
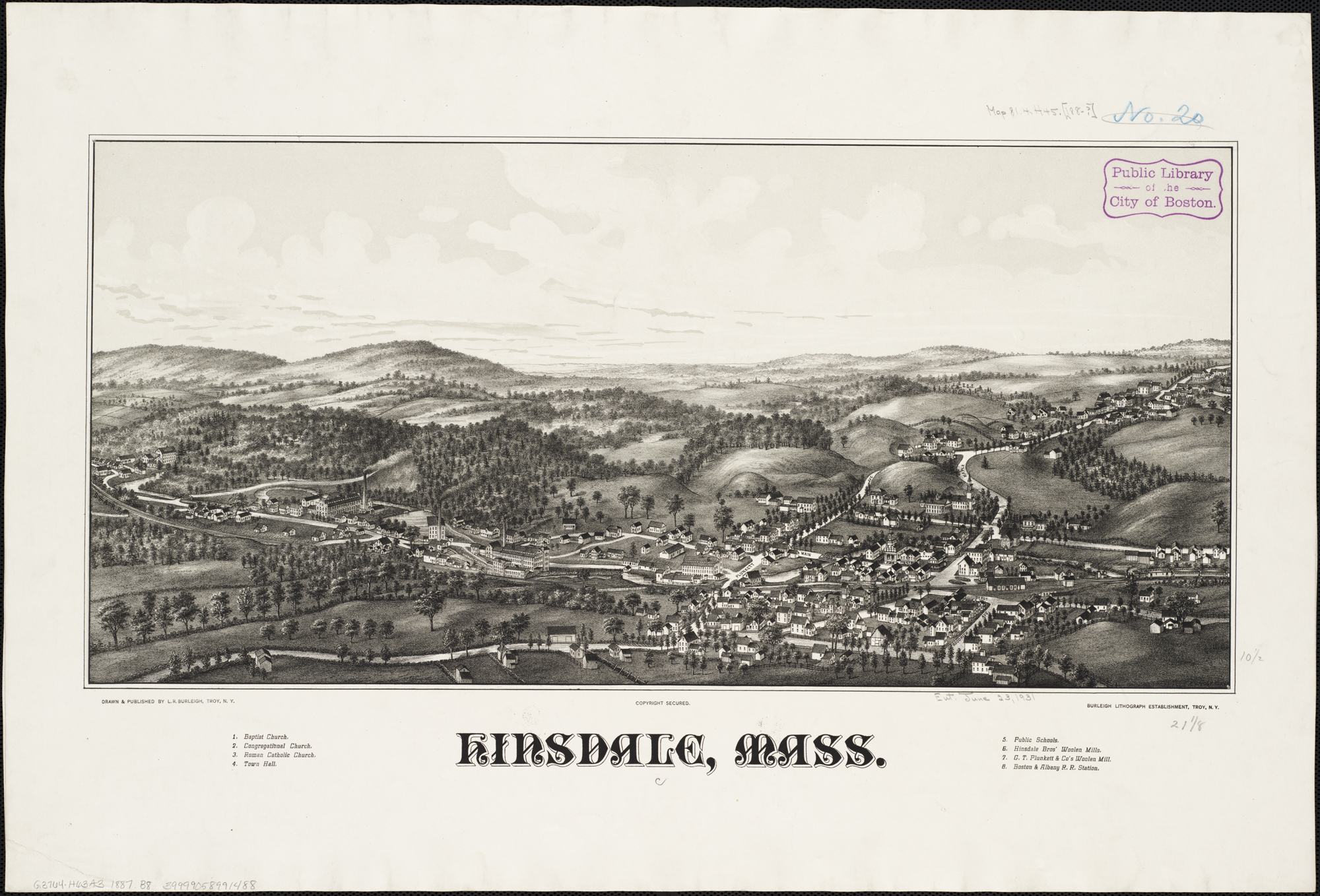
Panorama print of Hinsdale by L. R. Burleigh with listing of sights

According to the United States Census Bureau, the town has a total area of 21.7 square miles (56.2 km^{2}), of which 20.7 square miles (53.7 km^{2}) is land and 0.97 square miles (2.5 km^{2}), or 4.45%, is water. Hinsdale is located in central Berkshire County, and is bordered by Windsor to the north, Peru to the east, Washington to the south, and Dalton to the west. Hinsdale is 9 miles (14 km) east of Pittsfield, 42 miles (68 km) northwest of Springfield, and 120 miles (190 km) west of Boston.

Hinsdale is located in the Berkshire Hills, with most of its population located in a valley along the East Branch of the Housatonic River, whose origin is just south of the town line. Much of the land around the river south of the town center is part of the Hinsdale Flats Wildlife Management Reserve, and is generally a swampy area. There are four reservoirs within the town (Belmont, Plunkett, Cleveland Brook and a portion of the Windsor Reservoir), as well as part of Muddy Pond in the south and most of Lake Ashmere along the Peru town line. The town, which contains the peak of Tully Mountain along the western border, is traversed by a portion of the Appalachian Trail, which crosses the mountain. The town also has several summer camps and a country club.

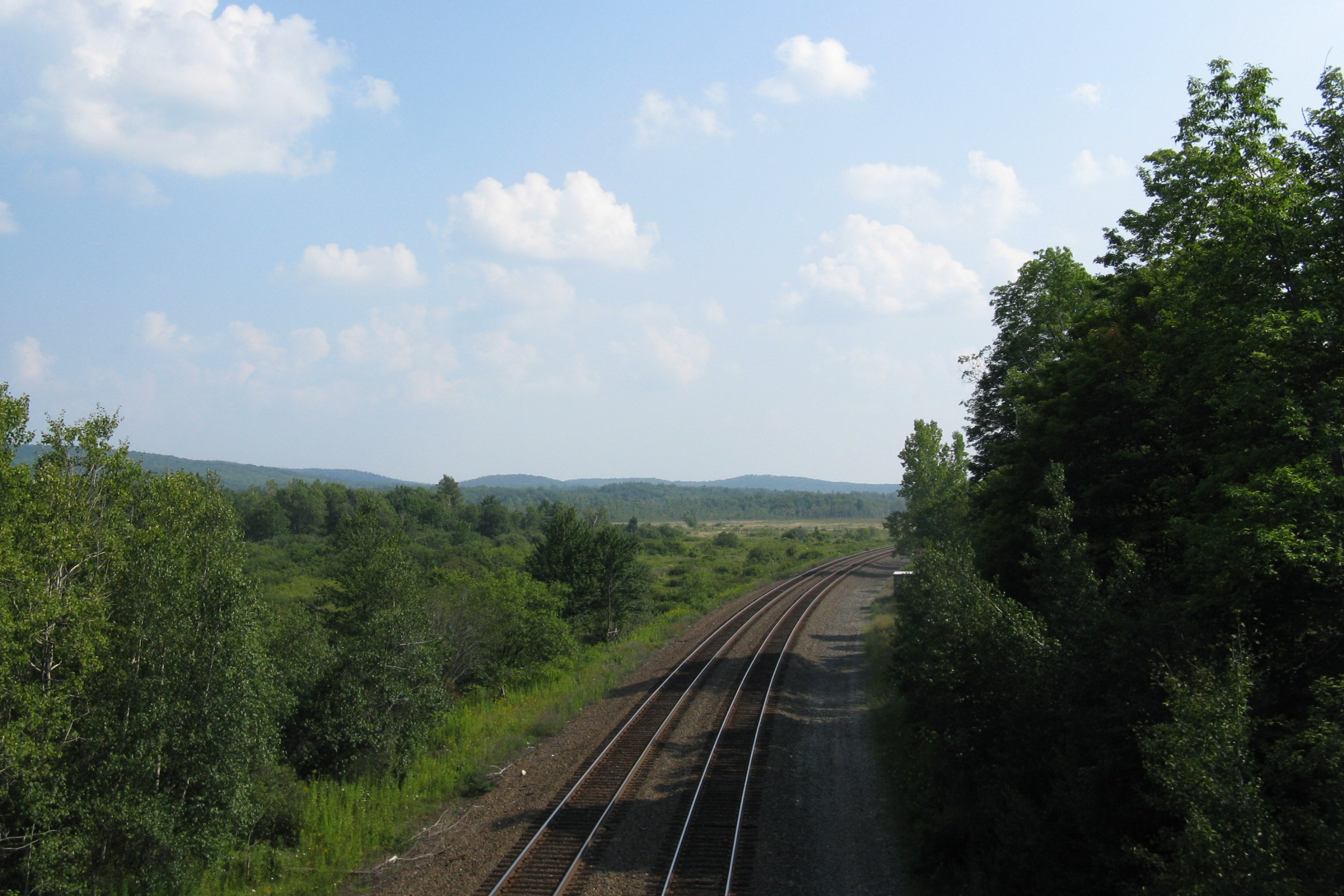
CSX tracks looking south from Route 8

Massachusetts Route 8 crosses the town from the south to the Dalton border in the northwest. Route 143 begins at Route 8 at the center of town. The town lies along a CSX Transportation rail line (former New York Central), which brings Amtrak and freight service to Pittsfield. The town lies at the eastern terminus of the Berkshire Regional Transit Authority bus service. Regional bus service can be found in Pittsfield, which is also home to the nearest regional air service (at Pittsfield Municipal Airport). The nearest airport with national flights is Bradley International Airport in Connecticut.

== Demographics ==
Historical population
Year	Pop.	±%
1850	1,253	—
1860	1,511	+20.6%
1870	1,695	+12.2%
1880	1,595	−5.9%
1890	1,739	+9.0%
1900	1,485	−14.6%
1910	1,116	−24.8%
1920	1,065	−4.6%
1930	1,144	+7.4%
1940	1,235	+8.0%
1950	1,560	+26.3%
1960	1,414	−9.4%
1970	1,588	+12.3%
1980	1,707	+7.5%
1990	1,959	+14.8%
2000	1,872	−4.4%
2010	2,032	+8.5%
2020	1,919	−5.6%
2022*	1,900	−1.0%
* = population estimate. Source: United States census records and Population Estimates Program data.

As of the census of 2020, there were 1919 people, 798 households, and 1,126 housing units in the town.

As of the census of 2000, by population, the town ranks 13th of the 32 cities and towns in Berkshire County, and 292nd of 351 cities and towns in Massachusetts. The population density was 89.8 inhabitants per square mile (34.7/km^{2}), which ranks 13th and 290th in the county and Commonwealth, respectively. There were 970 housing units at an average density of 46.6 per square mile (18.0/km^{2}). The racial makeup of the town was 97.81% White, 0.53% African American, 0.27% Asian, and 1.39% from two or more races. Hispanic or Latino of any race were 0.32% of the population.

There were 739 households, out of which 31.5% had children under the age of 18 living with them, 54.1% were married couples living together, 9.2% had a female householder with no husband present, and 31.0% were non-families. Of all households, 25.7% were made up of individuals, and 7.3% had someone living alone who was 65 years of age or older. The average household size was 2.53 and the average family size was 3.04.

In the town, the population was spread out, with 25.6% under the age of 18, 7.4% from 18 to 24, 29.8% from 25 to 44, 25.9% from 45 to 64, and 11.3% who were 65 years of age or older. The median age was 38 years. For every 100 females, there were 103.0 males. For every 100 females age 18 and over, there were 99.1 males.

The median income for a household in the town was $42,500, and the median income for a family was $51,118. Males had a median income of $38,333 versus $24,420 for females. The per capita income for the town was $19,797. About 6.4% of families and 8.2% of the population were below the poverty line, including 11.5% of those under age 18 and 8.2% of those age 65 or over.

City-stats.org data for Town of Hinsdale, Massachusetts reports 66.5% of the population are registered Democrats, 30.57% Republicans, and 2.9% independents.

== Government ==
Hinsdale employs the open town meeting form of government, and is led by a board of selectmen. The town has its own services, including police, fire and public works departments. Hinsdale shares its post office (and its ZIP Code of 01235) with neighboring Peru. The nearest hospital, the Berkshire Medical Center, is located in Pittsfield.

On the state level, Hinsdale is represented in the Massachusetts House of Representatives as part of the Second Berkshire district, which covers central Berkshire County, as well as portions of Hampshire and Franklin counties, and is represented by Democrat Paul Mark. In the Massachusetts Senate, the town is part of the Berkshire, Hampshire and Franklin district, which includes all of Berkshire County and western Hampshire and Franklin counties, and is represented by Democrat Benjamin Downing. Hinsdale has its own police department, which patrols the town, and Hinsdale is also patrolled by the Fourth (Cheshire) Station of Barracks "B" of the Massachusetts State Police. Newly elected Selectman Bartholomew J. Collins represents the town on the campaign of “Small towns working together make strong towns”. Republican Governor Charlie Baker has an approval rating of 62% as of September, 2016.

On the national level, Hinsdale is represented in the United States House of Representatives as part of Massachusetts's 1st congressional district, by Democrat Richard Neal of Springfield. Massachusetts is currently represented in the United States Senate by senior Senator, Democrat Elizabeth Warren and junior Senator, Democrat Ed Markey.

== Education ==
Hinsdale is one of the seven towns in the Central Berkshire Regional School District, the largest district (by land area) in the Commonwealth. Students in Hinsdale attend the Kittredge Elementary School in the town for elementary school, along with students from Peru. All students in the district travel to Dalton to attend Nessacus Regional Middle School for sixth through eighth grades and Wahconah Regional High School for the high grades. There are no private schools in Hinsdale, with the nearest being in the Pittsfield area.

The nearest community college is Berkshire Community College in Pittsfield. The nearest state college is Massachusetts College of Liberal Arts in North Adams, the nearest state university is the University of Massachusetts Amherst, and the nearest private college is Williams College in Williamstown.

== Points of interest ==
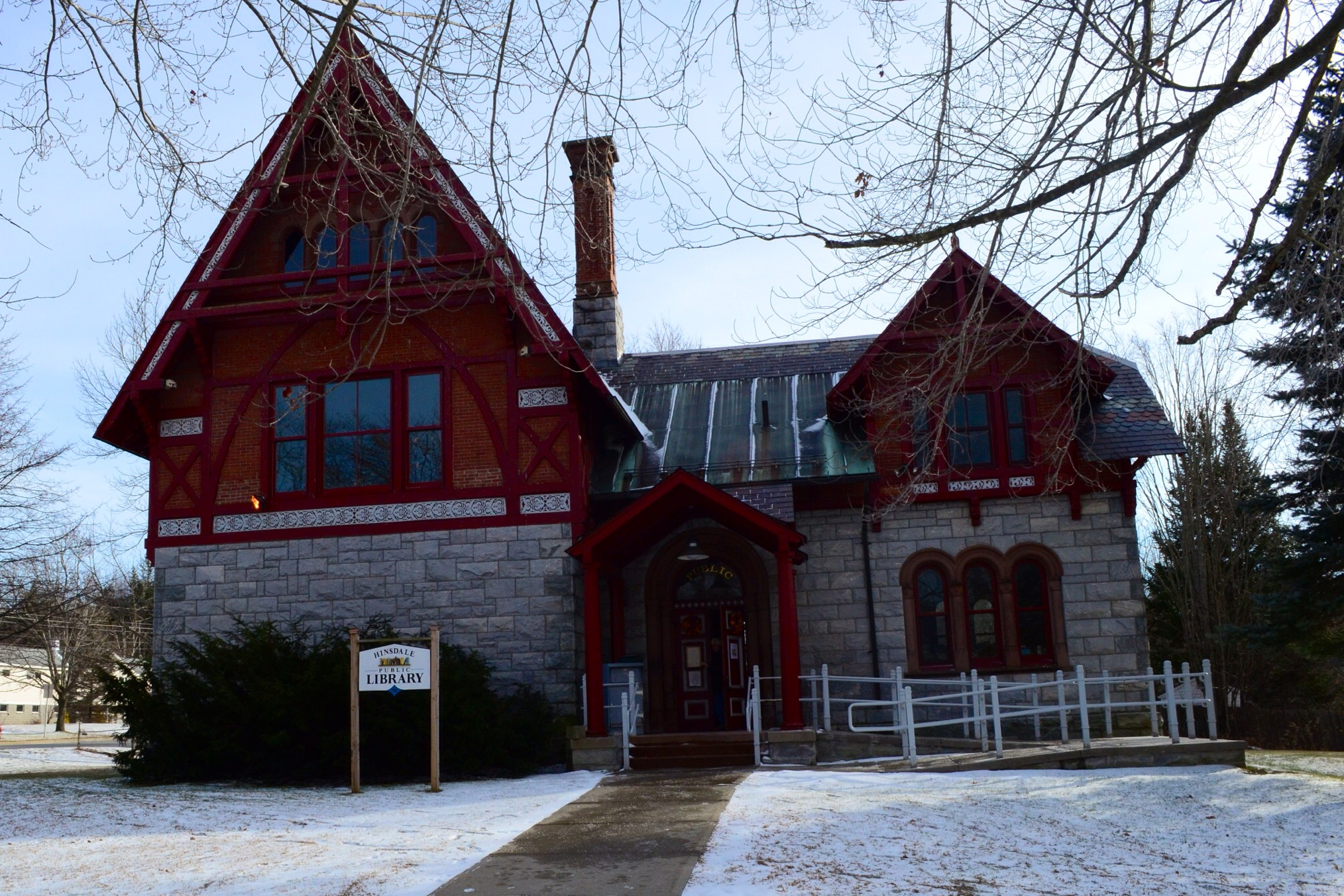
Hinsdale Town Library, erected in 1866, is a rare early example of French Tudor style imported to North America.

- Bas Ridge Golf Course
- Berkshire Lake Camp
- Camp Danbee
- Camp Emerson
- Camp Romaca
- Camp Taconic
- Hinsdale Public Library
- Hinsdale Town Hall
- Israel Bissell Homestead and Grave
- Lake Ashmere
- Plunkett Lake

== Notable people ==
- Israel Bissell, was a patriot post rider in Massachusetts who, along with Paul Revere, brought news to American colonists of the British attack at the Battle of Lexington and Concord on April 19, 1775, and subsequently was the beginning of the American Revolution. Bissell lived and died on October 24, 1823, in Hinsdale and was buried in the Maple Street Cemetery in Hinsdale
- Anne Froelick, screenwriter
- Daniel Webster Gill, Mayor of Cheyenne and member of the Wyoming Senate
- Augustus P. Hascall, congressman from New York
- Henry Howard, banker, businessman, mayor of Detroit, and first treasurer of Michigan
- Francis E. Warren, first governor of Wyoming
- Merrick Wing, Wisconsin state senator
- Ashley B. Wright, congressman from Massachusetts
