= Senator Latimer =

Senator Latimer may refer to:

== Members of the United States Senate ==
- Asbury Latimer (1851–1908), U.S. Senator from South Carolina
- Henry Latimer (politician) (1752–1819), U.S. Senator from Delaware

== United States state senate members ==
- Albert H. Latimer (1800–1877), Texas State Senate
- George Latimer (New York politician) (born 1953), New York State Senate
- W. Irving Latimer (1836–1922), Michigan State Senate
