= Albert Lee (accountant) =

American accountant

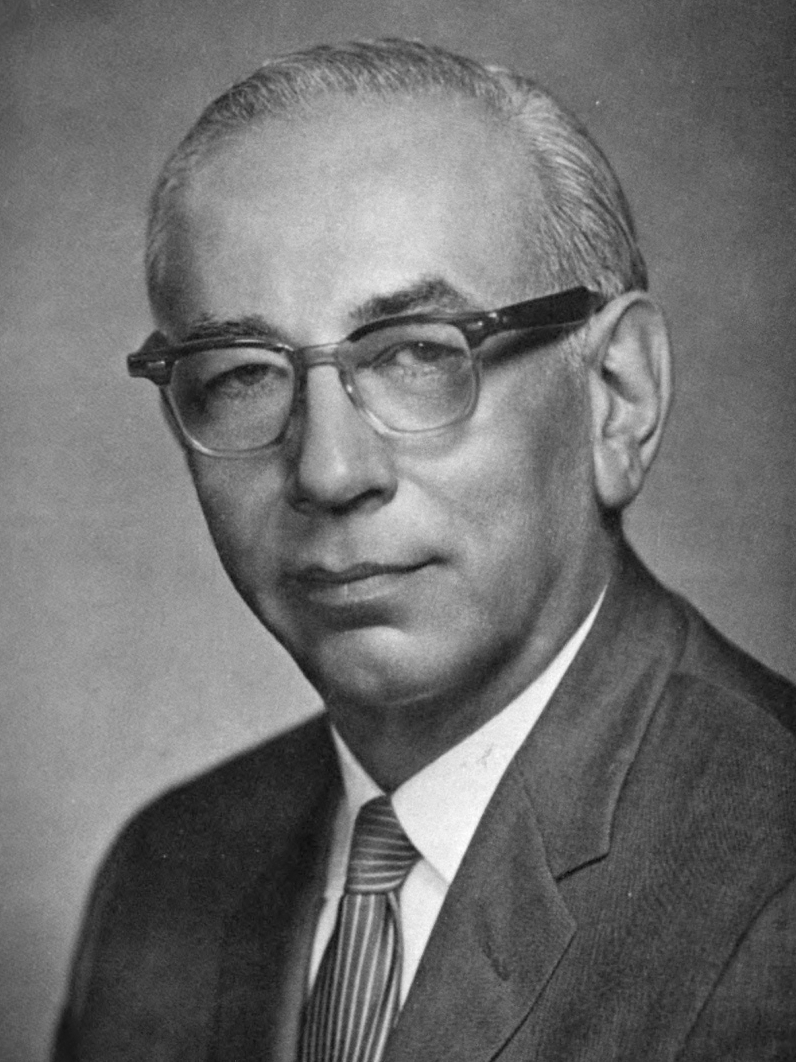

Michigan Auditor General
- In office 1965–1982
- Governor: George W. Romney; William Milliken
- Preceded by: Allison Green
- Succeeded by: Franklin C. Pinkelman

Personal details
- Born: December 15, 1910 Detroit, Michigan
- Died: July 10, 1982 (aged 71)
- Party: Democratic
- Spouse: Delphine Baron
- Education: Walsh Institute of Accountancy and Business Administration; Detroit Institute of Technology

Albert Lee (December 15, 1910 – July 10, 1982) served as Michigan Auditor General.

== Early life and education ==
Lee was born on December 15, 1910, in Detroit. There, Lee received an elementary and secondary education. In 1942, Lee graduated from the Walsh Institute of Accountancy and Business Administration. Lee went on to do post graduate work and alumnus at the Detroit Institute of Technology.

== Career ==
In 1945, Lee started work as a public accountant. In 1950, Lee founded the firm Albert Lee and Co. in Detroit. He served as the senior partner of the firm until January 1965. Lee served as the special consultant of a number of Michigan Auditors General, including Frank S. Szymanski, Otis M. Smith, and Billie S. Farnum. Lee served as the secretary-treasurer of the Michigan State Board of Accountancy from January 1, 1959, to October 15, 1963. Lee served as vice-chairman of Michigan Governor G. Mennen Williams and John Swainson's Special Task Force for state problems from 1959 to 1963. Lee served as Michigan Auditor General from 1965 to 1982. Lee was a member of multiple accounting associations, including the American Institute of Certified Public Accountants, the National Associations of Accountants, and the American Accounting Association.

== Personal life ==
Lee was married to Delphine Baron. Together, they had two children, Marc and Helaine. Lee was a Freemason, and was awarded the 33° honorary degree. Freemason.

== Death ==
Lee died at the age of 71 on July 10, 1982.
