= Andrew Mack (politician) =

American politician

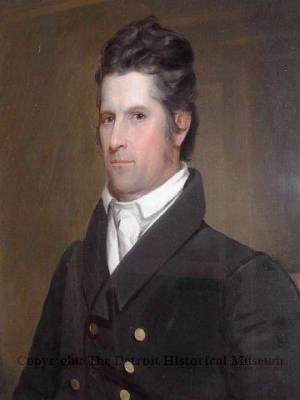

11th Mayor of Detroit, second charter
- In office 1834–1834
- Preceded by: Charles Christopher Trowbridge
- Succeeded by: Levi Cook

Personal details
- Born: July 9, 1780 New London, Connecticut
- Died: July 12, 1854 (aged 74) St. Clair County, Michigan

Andrew Mack (1780 – July 12, 1854 (Note: A 1907 source has him living from 1782 to 1857. A third source states that he died in 1875, which is almost certainly a typo.)) was an American businessman and politician who, among other things, co-founded the Detroit Free Press, served as mayor of Detroit, Michigan, and whose land holdings became a portion of the town of Marysville.

== Early life ==
Mack was born in New London, Connecticut, and was a sailor as a young man, having sailed around the world three times. In 1804, (Note: Possibly 1808.) he drove a herd of merino sheep that he had purchased in Spain westward to Cincinnati, Ohio, where he established a wool factory and a hotel. In the War of 1812, he was the captain of a military company and subsequently served as member of the Cincinnati City Council and as a state senator in the Ohio General Assembly. He ran for Mayor of Cincinnati in the spring of 1829, but lost to the incumbent Isaac G. Burnet.

== Detroit ==
President Andrew Jackson appointed him to become customs collector for Detroit in 1829, a post he held for ten years. Upon his arrival in the Michigan Territory, he became involved with the local militia and gained the appellation "Colonel". In 1831, Sheldon McKnight established the Democratic Free Press and Michigan Intelligencer (it eventually was renamed to the Detroit Free Press in 1866) and less than a year later, the newspaper was purchased by a consortium of citizens, one of whom was Mack. That group owned the business until 1837.

Mayor Charles Christopher Trowbridge was elected in early 1834 during a cholera epidemic, but abruptly resigned. Mack won the ensuing special election on September 24 with 91 votes. In the general election the following year, Mack ran for re-election, but lost. He tried again in 1837, but also was unsuccessful. In 1839, he represented Wayne County in the state legislature. It is sometimes believed that Mack Avenue in Detroit is named after Andrew Mack, but that was actually named after John M. Mack, who was a supervisor of Hamtramck.

== Marysville ==
Mack moved to St. Clair County in the 1840s. He purchased a sawmill, and the creek next to which it sat became known as Mack's Creek. He also set up a general store and a wood refueling station to serve the steamships sailing on the Great Lakes Waterway. This stop, known as "Mack's Place", became popular enough to warrant its own post office, and Mack served as its postmaster until his death. Mack and his wife Amelia were buried on his property, which is now the Marysville Golf Course. A model of Mack's home can be found at the Marysville Historical Museum in Marysville Park. The house and mill were taken over by George W. Carleton and the creek subsequently became known as Carleton Creek, a name it still bears today. The post office moved to nearby Vicksburg, which was renamed Marysville in 1859 to avoid confusion with Vicksburg in Kalamazoo County.

Political offices
Preceded by Charles Christopher Trowbridge	Mayor of Detroit; 1834	Succeeded by Levi Cook
