= Charles Christopher Trowbridge =

American politician and explorer

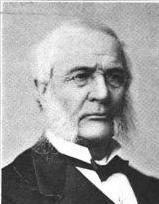

Mayor of Detroit
- In office 1834–1834
- Preceded by: Marshall Chapin
- Succeeded by: Andrew Mack

Personal details
- Born: December 29, 1800 Albany, New York
- Died: April 3, 1883 (aged 82) Detroit, Michigan
- Spouse: Catherine Whipple Sibley
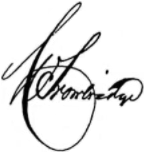
- Signature

Charles Christopher Trowbridge (December 29, 1800 – April 3, 1883) was an explorer, politician, businessman, and ethnographer of Native American cultures who lived in Detroit during the 19th century. He was one of the first businessmen who emigrated to what was then the Michigan Territory.

== Early life ==
Charles Trowbridge was born on December 29, 1800, in Albany, New York; the youngest of six children born to Luther Trowbridge and Elizabeth Tillman Trowbridge. His father was a Revolutionary War veteran who had fought at the battles of Lexington and Saratoga, among others. Luther Trowbridge died in 1802, and Charles grew up with his mother. In 1813, Charles apprenticed to the businessman Horatio Ross of Owego, New York, who trained him as a merchant. In 1818, economic troubles bankrupted Ross, and Trowbridge, then not quite eighteen, was charged with closing up the business. Trowbridge continued independently in the merchant trade, but quickly decided to move west. In 1819, he secured a position with Major Thomas Rowland of Detroit as Deputy United States Marshal and deputy Clerk of the Court.

== Early career in Detroit ==
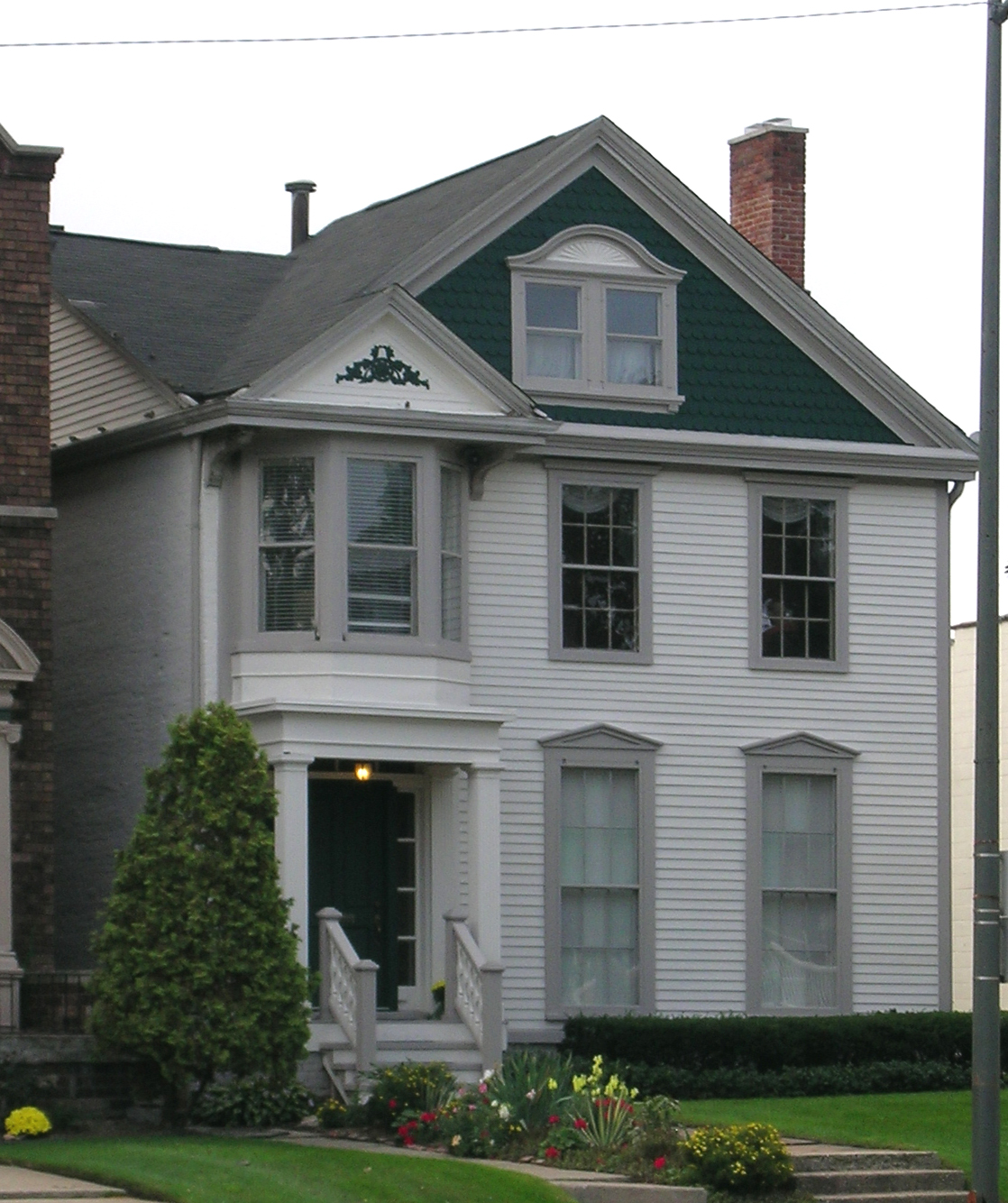
Historic Charles Trowbridge House (1826), Detroit's oldest known structure

Rowland encouraged Trowbridge to study law, and the young man quickly picked up a great deal of legal knowledge, and assisted in recording the 1820 census in Michigan Territory. In 1820, Trowbridge served on the Lewis Cass expedition, led by Lewis Cass, that officially explored the section of Michigan Territory between the Great Lakes and the headwaters of the Mississippi River. Cass was impressed by Trowbridge, and made him his private secretary.

In 1821, Trowbridge helped negotiate a treaty between the US government and the Winnebago and Menominee peoples. With this experience, and his knowledge of the Cherokee language, Trowbridge was appointed assistant secretary in the local government department for Native American affairs, and soon after was also made interpreter.

Around this time, Trowbridge was made secretary of the Board of Regents of the University of Michigan.

In 1823, Trowbridge was tasked with determining the relationships among the languages and customs of the indigenous tribes in Michigan Territory. He worked at this, as well as his interpreter duties, through 1825, when he resigned his post in favor of becoming cashier of the newly established Bank of Michigan.

In 1826, Trowbridge married Catherine Whipple Sibley, oldest daughter of Solomon Sibley. That same year, he built a home, the Charles Trowbridge House, on Jefferson Avenue on what was then farmland about a mile from the heart of the city. At the time, it was considered to be the finest frame house in Michigan territory. Trowbridge lived in this house for over 50 years, and it currently still stands and is likely the oldest existing home in the city of Detroit. Trowbridge lived in the house until his death in 1883.

== Later career ==
In 1831, Lewis Cass was appointed Secretary of War, and invited Trowbridge to accompany him to Washington, D.C.. After much soul-searching, Trowbridge declined, preferring to stay in the private sector. He engaged in other enterprises over the next few years, including extensive land purchases. He was one of the original platters of the village of Allegan, Michigan.

In 1833, Trowbridge became an alderman of the city of Detroit, and briefly served as Mayor during the cholera epidemic of 1834, resigning his position soon after. In 1837, he ran as the Whig candidate for governor of Michigan, and was defeated by Stevens T. Mason. This was the last time he ran for public office.

In 1844, he became president of the Michigan State Bank, leading that institution until its dissolution in 1853. He became secretary-treasurer, and later president, of the Detroit and Milwaukee Railway Company and was one of the directors of the Detroit and St. Joseph Railway Company.

Trowbridge also served on the boards of several charitable institutions, including as president of the Board of Public Charities, various bible and missionary societies, and the Historical and Algic Societies.

He died in Detroit on April 3, 1883.

== See also ==
- Charles Trowbridge House

Party political offices
| Preceded by John Biddle | Whig nominee for Governor of Michigan; 1837 | Succeeded by William Woodbridge |
Political offices
| Preceded by Levi Cook | Mayor of Detroit; 1834 | Succeeded by Andrew Mack |
