= William C. Stevens (Michigan politician) =

American politician

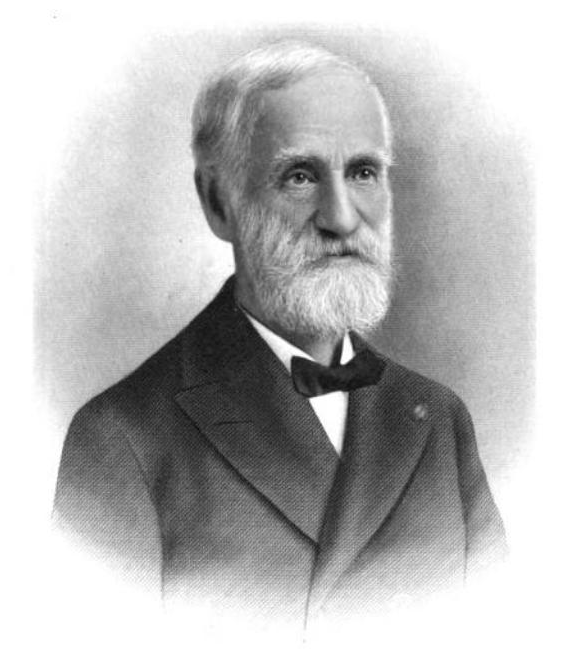

Michigan Auditor General
- In office 1883–1886
- Governor: Josiah Begole
- Preceded by: W. Irving Latimer
- Succeeded by: Henry H. Aplin

Personal details
- Born: November 14, 1837 Plymouth, Michigan, US
- Died: August 20, 1921 (aged 83) Detroit, Michigan, US
- Party: Republican
- Spouse: Laura C.

Military service
- Allegiance: United States Army (Union Army)
- Rank: Major
- Battles/wars: American Civil War

William C. Stevens (1837-1921) was a Michigan politician who served as Michigan Auditor General from 1883 to 1886.

== Early life ==
Stevens was born on November 14, 1837, in Plymouth, Michigan, to father William N. Stevens.

== Military career ==
Stevens served as a Major in the American Civil War and was honorably discharged in July 1865.

== Political career ==
Stevens served as multiple positions in the Iosco County local government, including the county treasurer and prosecuting attorney. Stevens served as Michigan Auditor General from 1883 to 1886. Stevens was a Republican.

== Personal life ==
Stevens married Laura C. Warden on April 21, 1869, and together they had at least one child. Stevens was a member of both the Grand Army of the Republic and Loyal Legion. Stevens was Methodist.

== Death ==
Stevens died on August 20, 1921, in Detroit, Michigan. He is interred at Forest Hill Cemetery in Ann Arbor, Michigan.
