= Thomas H. McTavish =

American accountant

Michigan Auditor General
- In office 1989–2014
- Governor: James Blanchard; John Engler; Jennifer Granholm; Rick Snyder
- Preceded by: Charles S. Jones
- Succeeded by: Doug A. Ringler

Personal details
- Born: January 12, 1943 Gallitzin, Pennsylvania
- Died: January 29, 2022 (aged 79)
- Education: Pennsylvania State University

Military service
- Allegiance: United States Navy
- Rank: Captain

Thomas H. McTavish (January 12, 1943 – January 9, 2022) was the Michigan Auditor General from 1989 to 2014.

McTavish graduated from Gallitzin High School in 1960. He was senior class president. He graduated from Pennsylvania State University with an accounting major and economics minor and is a lifetime member of the Penn State Alumni Association. McTavish served as a Navy Captain. McTavish previously served as the president of the National Association of State Auditors.
