= John K. Stack Jr. =

American politician (1884–1935)

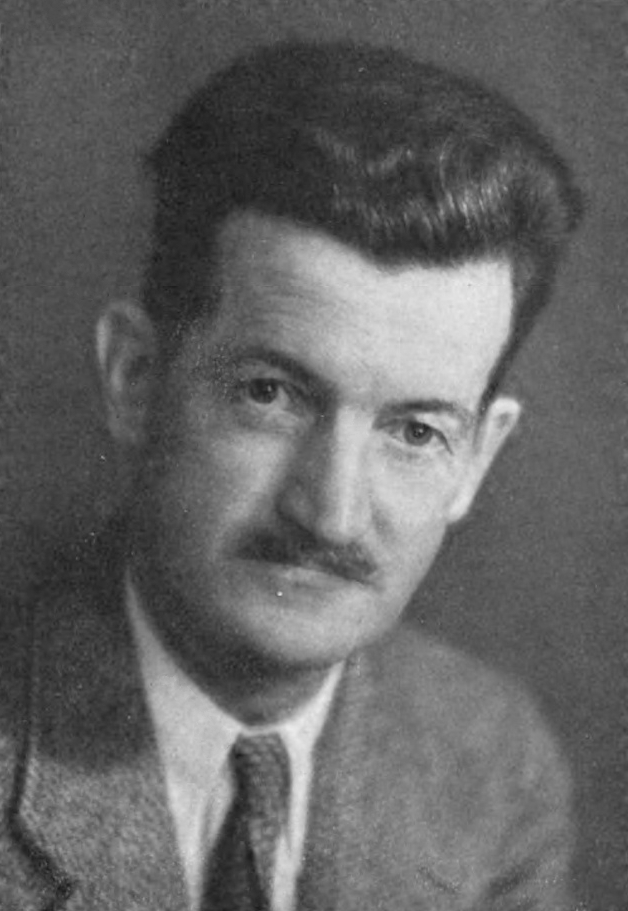

Michigan Auditor General
- In office 1933 – January 18, 1935
- Governor: William Comstock; Frank Fitzgerald
- Preceded by: Oramel B. Fuller
- Succeeded by: John J. O'Hara

Personal details
- Born: February 13, 1884 Escanaba, Michigan, US
- Died: January 18, 1935 (aged 50)
- Party: Democratic

John King Stack Jr. (February 13, 1884 – January 18, 1935) was a Michigan politician who served as Michigan Auditor General from 1933 to 1935.

== Early life ==
Stack was born on February 13, 1884, in Escanaba, Michigan, to John King and Jane Ann Stack.

== Political career ==
In 1928, Stack was an alternate delegate to the Democratic National Convention from Michigan. In 1930, Stack unsuccessfully ran for the position of Michigan Auditor General. He ran successfully for the same position in 1933. Stack unsuccessfully ran in the Democratic primary for the Governor of Michigan in 1934.

== Death ==
Stack died in office on January 18, 1935. Stack is interred in the Holy Cross Cemetery in Escanaba.
