= Townsend A. Ely =

American politician (1843–1928)

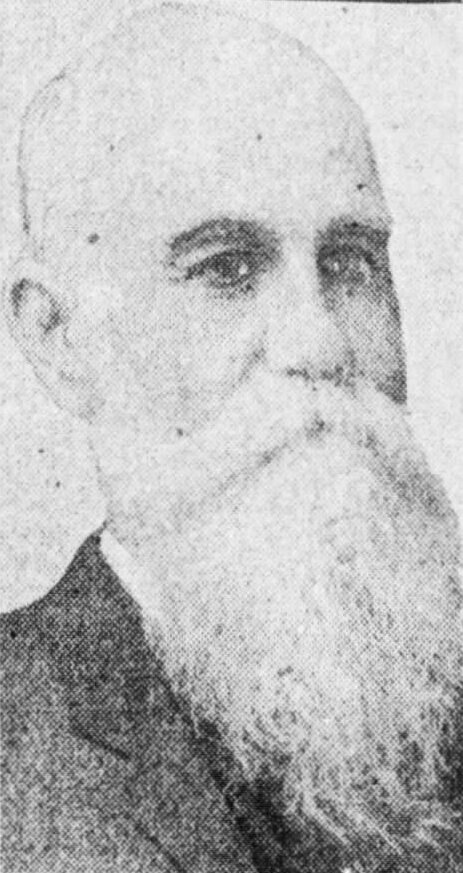
- Ely in a 1928 newspaper

Member of the Michigan Senate from the 19th district
- In office 1904–1908
- Preceded by: Coleman C. Vaughan
- Succeeded by: Fred B. Kline

Personal details
- Born: August 27, 1843 Wabash, Indiana, U.S.
- Died: August 14, 1928 (aged 84) Alma, Michigan, U.S.
- Spouse: Margaret Chapin (m. 1866; died 1912)
- Children: 1
- Parent: Ralph Ely (father)
- Occupation: Politician; farmer; mail carrier

Townsend A. Ely (August 27, 1843 – August 14, 1928) was an American politician from Michigan. He served as a member of Michigan Senate from 1904 to 1908. He was mayor of Alma, Michigan, for three terms.

== Early life ==
Townsend A. Ely was born on August 27, 1843, in Wabash, Indiana, to Ralph Ely. The family later moved to Ionia County, Michigan. They moved to Alma in 1854. He attended common schools.

== Career ==
Ely enlisted on February 25, 1865, with company C of the 8th Michigan Infantry Regiment and fought at the Siege of Petersburg. He was promoted to sergeant by early April 1865. He was commissioned as a second lieutenant, but was not mustered in under the commission. He mustered out five months later on July 30. His father was a part of the same company and regiment. After the war, he purchased 240 acres (97 ha) and began farming. He expanded the farm another 100 acres (40 ha). He later worked as a mail carrier between Saginaw and St. Louis for close to three years. He then worked as a businessman.

In 1881, Ely became postmaster and served under presidents Hayes and Harrison. He was a member of the school board for 12 years. He served as mayor of Alma for three terms.

Ely served as a member of Michigan Senate, representing the 19th district, from 1904 to 1908. He introduced the bill that provided for Michigan's state highway department and appropriation for improving wagon roads. In April 1909, he was named by Governor Fred M. Warner to replace Horatio Earle as the state's highway commissioner. He served for four years, declining a second term. He was succeeded by Frank F. Rogers. He was appointed to the board of managers of the Soldiers' Home.

== Personal life ==
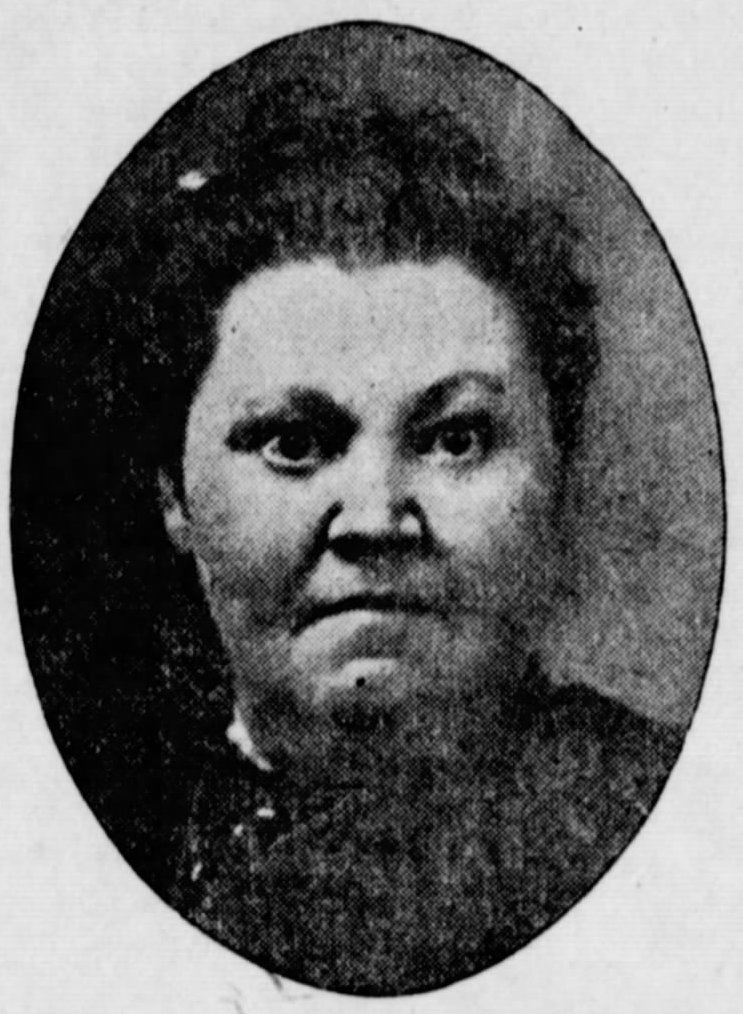
Photo of Ely's wife Margaret

Ely married Margaret Chapin, daughter of Edna (née Utley) and Dewitt Clinton Chapin, on September 25, 1866. They had one son, Ralph C. His wife died in 1912. He was a friend of Governor Warner.

Ely died on August 14, 1928, in Alma.
