= 1837 Michigan gubernatorial election =

- November 6, 1837-November 7, 1837
- Turnout: 94.38%
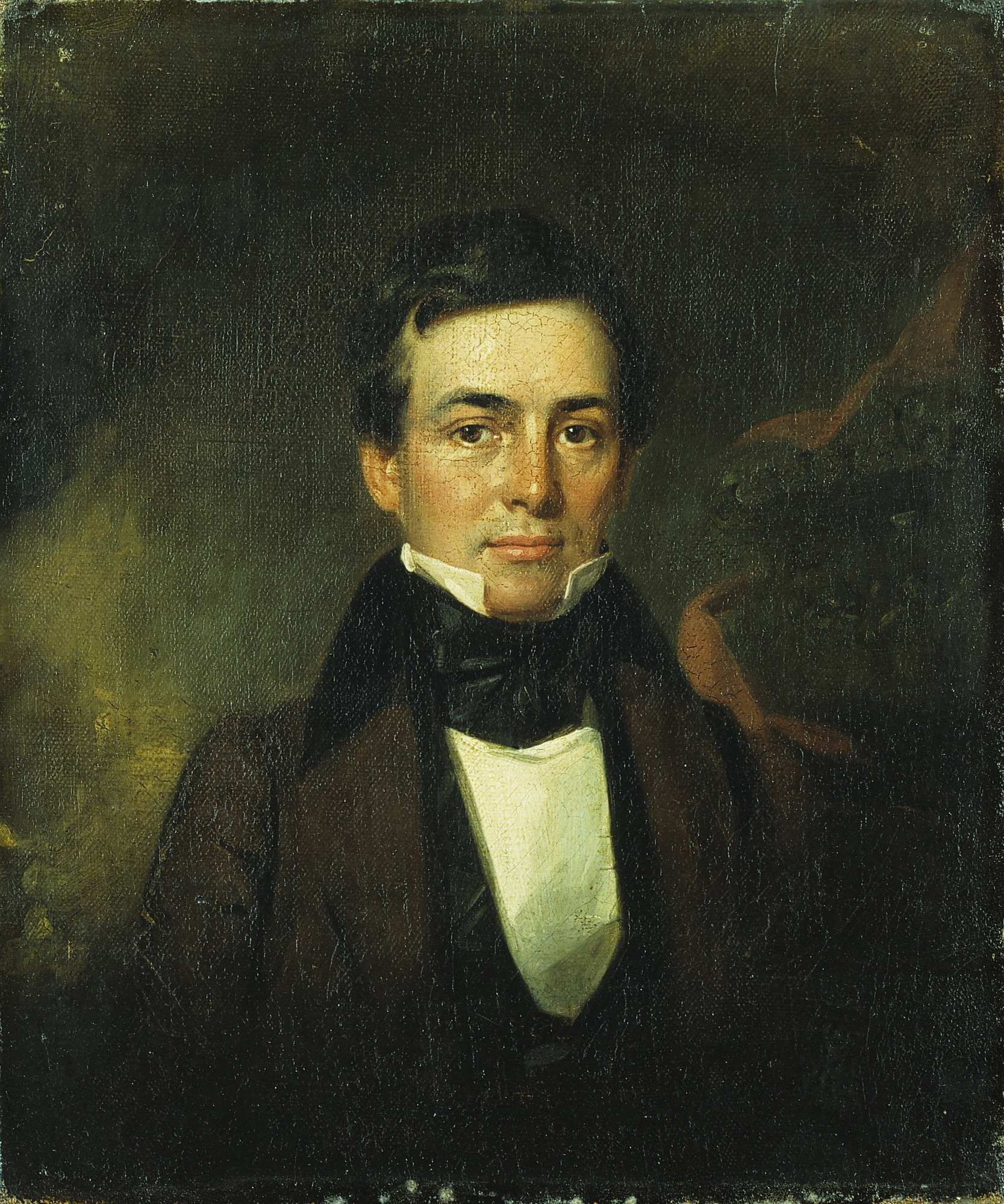

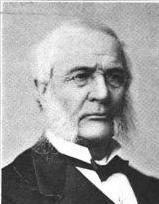
Nominee	Stevens T. Mason	Charles C. Trowbridge
Party	Democratic	Whig
Popular vote	14,867	14,424
Percentage	49.83%	48.35%
- County results Mason: 50–60% 60–70% 70–80% 80–90% Trowbridge: 50–60% 60–70% No Data/Votes
Governor before election
Stevens T. Mason
Democratic
Elected Governor
Stevens T. Mason
Democratic

The 1837 Michigan gubernatorial election was held from November 6, 1837, to November 7, 1837. Incumbent Democrat Stevens T. Mason defeated Whig nominee Charles C. Trowbridge with 49.83% of the vote.

== General election ==
=== Candidates ===
Major party candidates

- Stevens T. Mason, Democratic
- Charles C. Trowbridge, Whig

=== Results ===
1837 Michigan gubernatorial election
Party	Candidate	Votes	%	±%
Democratic	Stevens T. Mason (inc.)	14,867	49.83%	−40.48%
Whig	Charles C. Trowbridge	14,424	48.35%	+39.66%
	Scattering	544	1.82%	
Plurality		443	1.48%	
Total votes		29,835	100.00%	
Democratic hold		Swing	-80.14%	

==== Results By County ====
County	Stevens T. Mason Democratic		Charles C. Trowbridge Whig		Scattering Write-in		Margin		Total votes cast
County	#	%	#	%	#	%	#	%	Total votes cast
Allegan	98	22.74%	218	50.58%	115	26.68%	-120	-27.84%	431
Berrien	495	48.01%	534	51.79%	2	0.19%	-39	-3.78%	1,031
Branch	387	66.04%	199	33.96%	0	0.00%	188	32.08%	586
Calhoun	808	54.89%	664	45.11%	0	0.00%	144	9.78%	1,472
Cass	388	45.75%	459	54.13%	1	0.12%	-71	-8.37%	848
Chippewa	42	85.71%	7	14.29%	0	0.00%	35	71.43%	49
Genesee	233	48.04%	252	51.96%	0	0.00%	-19	-3.92%	485
Hillsdale	378	50.27%	374	49.73%	0	0.00%	4	0.53%	752
Ionia	148	61.92%	91	38.08%	0	0.00%	57	23.85%	239
Jackson (Note: Includes Ingham County)	758	42.95%	911	51.61%	96	5.44%	-153	-8.67%	1,765
Kalamazoo	577	43.42%	752	56.58%	0	0.00%	-175	-13.17%	1,329
Kent (Note: Includes Ottawa County)	394	75.62%	127	24.38%	0	0.00%	267	51.25%	521
Lapeer	227	48.30%	241	51.28%	2	0.43%	-14	-2.98%	470
Lenawee	1,345	50.97%	1,293	49.00%	1	0.04%	52	1.97%	2,639
Livingsto	443	56.43%	341	43.44%	1	0.13%	102	12.99%	785
Mackinac	89	67.42%	43	32.58%	0	0.00%	46	34.85%	132
Macomb	471	37.38%	689	54.68%	100	7.94%	-218	-17.30%	1,260
Monroe	999	55.69%	657	36.62%	138	7.69%	342	19.06%	1,794
Oakland	1,681	49.90%	1,639	48.65%	49	1.45%	42	1.25%	3,369
Saginaw	86	46.74%	98	53.26%	0	0.00%	-12	-6.52%	184
Shiawassee	123	47.86%	134	52.14%	0	0.00%	-11	-4.28%	257
St. Clair (Note: Not included in official canvass)	447	54.31%	376	45.69%	0	0.00%	71	8.63%	823
St. Joseph	557	53.00%	491	46.72%	3	0.29%	66	6.28%	1,051
Van Buren	103	56.91%	78	43.09%	0	0.00%	25	13.81%	181
Washtenaw	2,039	49.67%	2,066	50.33%	0	0.00%	-27	-0.66%	4,105
Wayne	1,998	48.73%	2,066	50.39%	36	0.88%	-68	-1.66%	4,100
Total	14,867	49.83%	14,424	48.35%	544	1.82%	443	1.48%	29,835

===== Counties that flipped from Democratic to Whig =====
- Allegan
- Berrien
- Cass
- Jackson
- Kalamazoo
- Lapeer
- Macomb
- Saginaw
- Washtenaw
- Wayne
