= Robert Abbott (Michigan politician) =

American politician (1770–1852)

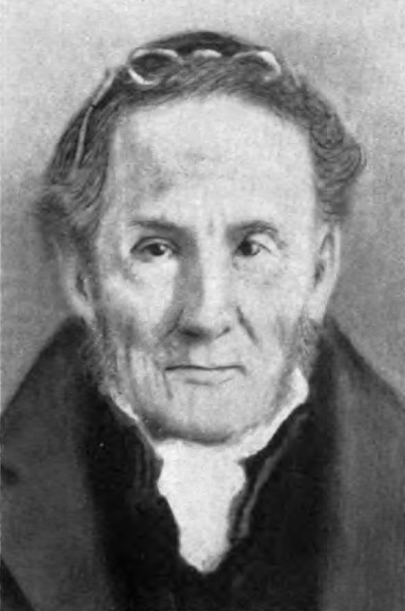

Michigan Auditor General
- In office 1836–1839
- Preceded by: Position established
- Succeeded by: Henry Howard

Michigan Territorial Treasurer
- In office 1813–1836
- Succeeded by: Henry Howard as Michigan State Treasurer

Personal details
- Born: 1770 Detroit, Province of Quebec
- Died: April 5, 1852 (aged 81–82) Coldwater, Michigan
- Party: Democratic

Robert Abbott (1770 – April 5, 1852) was a Michigan politician.

== Early life ==
Abbott was born in 1770 in Detroit, Province of Quebec. His father James Abbott was a Euro-American who had moved to what is now Michigan and who would have two other younger sons after Robert, James and Samuel.

== Career ==
Abbott became a partner with his father, James, in the fur trading business. Abbott served as Michigan Territorial Treasurer from 1813 to 1836. Abbott served as Michigan Auditor General from 1836 to 1839, when he retired.

== Personal life ==
Abbott was one of the first Methodists in Michigan. He built the first Methodist church in the state.

== Death ==
Abbott died on April 5, 1852, in Coldwater, Michigan.
