= William A. Burgett =

American politician (1932–1999)

Acting Michigan Auditor General
- In office October 10, 1961 – October 23, 1961
- Governor: John Swainson
- Preceded by: Otis M. Smith
- Succeeded by: Billie S. Farnum

Personal details
- Born: June 30, 1932 Des Moines, Iowa
- Died: April 10, 1999 (aged 66)
- Party: Democratic
- Spouse: Betsy Bartley
- Education: University of Iowa; Michigan State University

Military service
- Allegiance: United States
- Branch/service: United States Army
- Years of service: 1952-1954

William A. Burgett (June 30, 1932 – April 10, 1999) served as acting Michigan Auditor General in 1961.

== Early life and education ==
Burgett was born on June 30, 1932, in Des Moines, Iowa. In 1956, Burgett earned a B.A. from the University of Iowa. Burgett later attended Michigan State University in 1957 and 1958.

== Career ==
Burgett served in the United States Army from 1952 to 1954. At some point, Burgett served as the administrative assistant to Michigan Lieutenant Governor John B. Swainson and as the assistant to the chairman of the Michigan Democratic Party. Burgett was appointed Deputy Michigan Auditor General on June 21, 1960. On October 9, 1961, Michigan Auditor General Otis M. Smith resigned. Burgett was appointed acting state auditor general the following day. Billie S. Farnum was appointed and qualified as his successor on October 23, 1961.

== Personal life ==
Burgett was married to Betsy Bartley. Burgett was Methodist.

== Death ==
Burgett died on April 10, 1999.
