= Walsh College =

Private business college in Troy, Michigan, US

- Motto: Not Your Typical Business School
- Type: Private college
- Established: 1922
- President: Suzy Siegle
- Students: 3,500
- Undergraduates: 722 (spring 2022)
- Postgraduates: 1,022 (spring 2022)
- Location: Troy, Michigan, United States
- Colors: Royal Blue and White
- Website: walshcollege.edu

Walsh College is a private college in Troy, Michigan, United States. Founded in 1922 by Mervyn B. Walsh, it is an upper division undergraduate and graduate institution that primarily focuses on business education.

== History ==
The college began with the founding of the Walsh Institute of Accountancy and the introduction of the Pace Accounting Method, at the time an innovative way of teaching accounting. Mervyn B. Walsh, a certified public accountant, purchased a Pace & Pace franchise to offer the Pace Accounting Method exclusively in Detroit. He founded the Walsh Institute of Accountancy on July 7, 1922, and on September 18 of that year, 23 students were enrolled in the first courses at the institute.

When Mervyn Walsh retired in 1965, the state of Michigan had adopted a new bachelor's degree requirement for candidates to sit for the Uniform Certified Public Accountant (CPA) Examination. At this time, Michigan's community college system was developing and a pivotal decision was made to build upon, rather than compete with, the community colleges by becoming an upper-division college.

On December 31, 1968, Walsh Institute became an upper-division college offering a business education to juniors and seniors who had finished two years of college. The new Walsh College of Accountancy and Business Administration forged partnerships with Oakland and Macomb community colleges and in 1970 broke ground on a 10,000-square-foot building in Troy, Michigan, near both colleges.

The college offered its first bachelor's degrees, a Bachelor of Accountancy and Bachelor of Business Administration, in 1970. The first graduate degree, the Master of Science in Taxation, was offered in 1974. The following year, the North Central Association of Colleges and Schools (NCA) accredited Walsh College. Over the next several years, Walsh introduced Master of Science degrees in Professional Accountancy (1980), Finance (1986), and Management (1989). During the 1990s, the college continued to enlarge its facilities, offer classes at other locations in metropolitan Detroit, and introduce new degrees and online technology. The Master of Science in Information Management and Communication (MSIMC) degree was introduced in 1996.

In 1998 the Novi campus was opened and the Master of Business Administration (MBA) degree was introduced. The first online courses were offered in 1998.

In 2001, the National Council for State Authorization Reciprocity Agreements (NC-SARA) granted Walsh College approval to offer full online degree programs and provided the college with a full ten-year extension on its accreditation. The first fully online degree, the Master of Science in Information Assurance, was offered in 2005. Walsh College is recognized by the National Security Agency as a Center of Academic Excellence in Information Assurance Education (CAE) for its curriculum that maps to the Committee for National Security Standards. It is also recognized by the National Security Agency and Department of Homeland Security as a Center of Academic Excellence in Cyber Defense (CAE-CD) programs. Since 2003, these agencies have renewed the college's designation as a U.S. Center of Academic Excellence for Information Assurance Education.

In 2006, the NC-SARA gave the college approval to offer its first doctoral degree, the Doctor of Management (DM) in Executive Leadership. In the fall of 2007, the first student cohort entered the program.

The college received recognition in April 2010 for a grant to promote entrepreneurship among students and alumni. The Blackstone Charitable Foundation of New York announced that it had selected Walsh College and Detroit's Wayne State University to share a $2 million grant to initiate Blackstone LaunchPad.

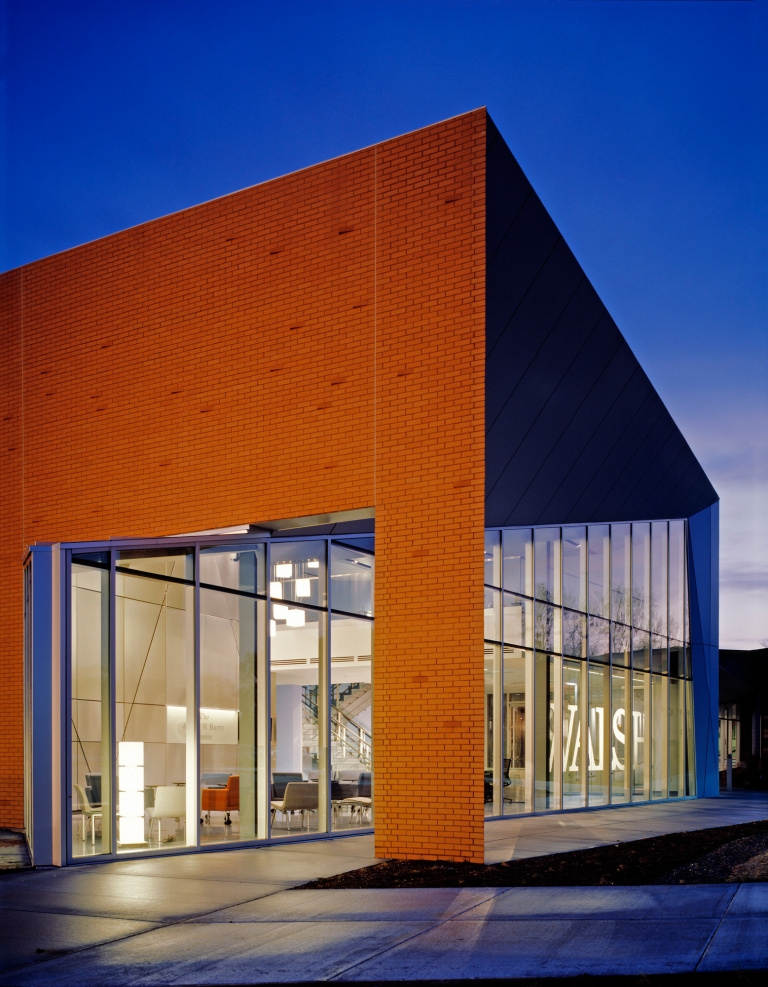
Jeffery W. Barry Center

In 2017, Walsh College was honored by the American School & University 2017 Educational Interiors Showcase in the Collegiate Citation and Administrative Areas/Office categories.

== Campus locations ==
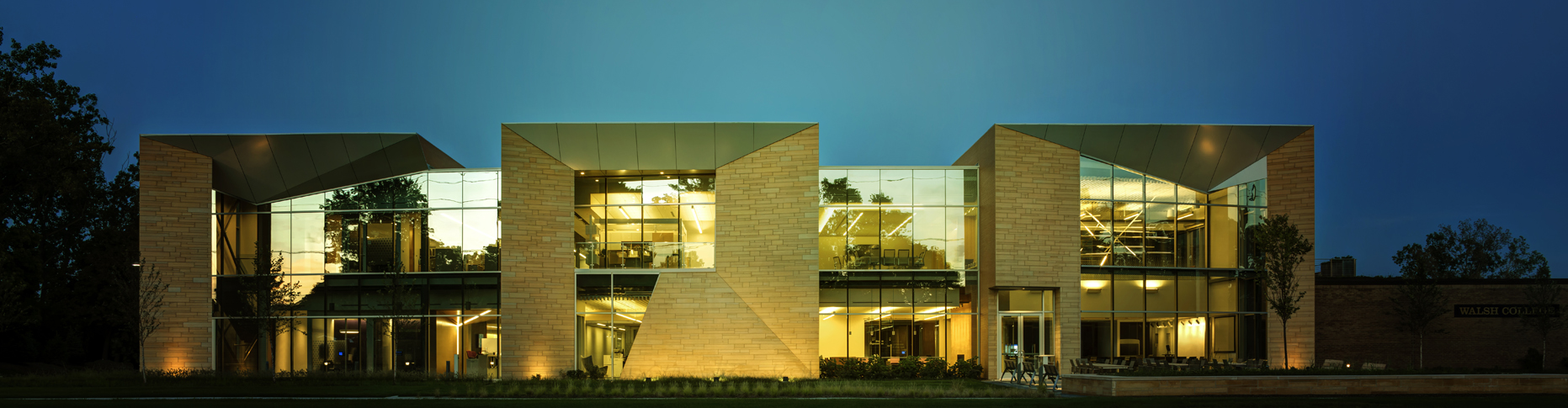
Troy Campus

The college has a main campus in Troy and offers classes at the University Center at Macomb Community College. in Clinton Township, Macomb County, Michigan, as well as online.They also have a campus in United Arab Emirates which is the Walsh College UAE campus.

== Accreditation ==
Walsh is accredited by the Higher Learning Commission and some programs are accredited by the Accreditation Council for Business Schools and Programs.

== Notable alumni ==
- Cynthia A. Johnson
- Ronald L. Bonkowski
- James DeSana Sr.
- Jeff Farrington
- Deborah Chase Hopkins
- Lisa Howze
- Albert Lee (accountant)
- Earl Poleski
- Michael J. Skindell
