= John J. O'Hara (politician) =

American politician (1885–1954)

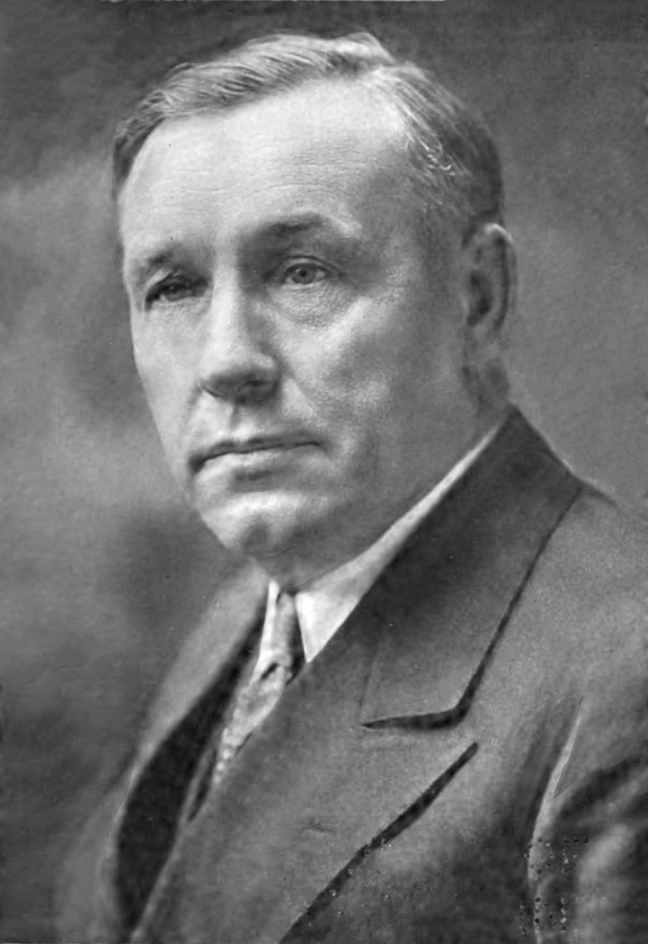

Michigan Auditor General
- In office January 22, 1935 – 1936
- Governor: Frank Fitzgerald
- Preceded by: John K. Stack Jr.
- Succeeded by: George T. Gundry

Personal details
- Born: August 11, 1885 Stiles, Wisconsin, US
- Died: October 12, 1954 (aged 69)
- Party: Republican
- Spouse: Helen Doyle (d. 1934); Nell Kaufman
- Education: Detroit College of Law

John J. O'Hara (August 11, 1885 – October 12, 1954) was a Michigan politician.

== Early life ==
O'Hara was born in the village of Stiles, Wisconsin on August 11, 1885. After receiving an early education at public and religious schools, O'Hara attended the Detroit College of Law, graduating in 1908.

== Career ==
After graduating in 1908, O'Hara started practicing law in Menominee, Michigan immediately. O'Hara held a number of public offices, including the position of Menominee County prosecuting attorney from 1919 to 1920 and Menominee city attorney. O'Hara was a member of both the Michigan Bar Association and the American Bar Association. Before his time as Michigan Auditor General, O'Hara had 27 years of law experience in the Upper Peninsula of Michigan, where he gained a specialization in corporate and criminal practices. Upon the death of Auditor General John K. Stack Jr. in office, O'Hara was appointed to the position by Governor Frank Fitzgerald on January 21, 1935. O'Hara was confirmed for the position on January 22, 1935. In 1936, O'Hara was not re-elected to the position.

== Personal life ==
In August 1934, John J. O'Hara was widowed upon the death of his wife, Helen Doyle O'Hara. Together, they had four children, two daughters and two sons, including Michael D. O'Hara. At some point, John remarried to Nell Kaufman. John was a member of the Knights of Columbus, and served for two years as a state deputy for the order. John was also a member of the Order of the Elks.

== Death ==
O'Hara died on October 12, 1954.
