= Henry H. Aplin =

American politician (1841–1910)

Tip Aplin
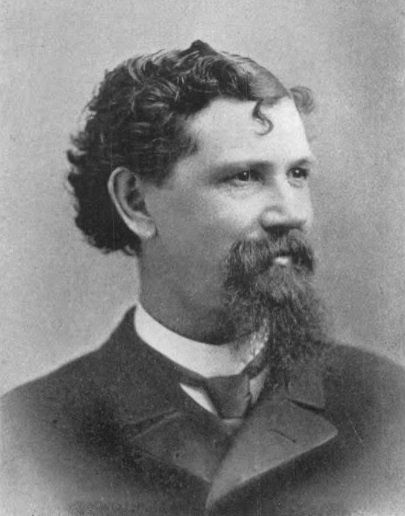
- From 1900's Men of Progress: Embracing Biographical Sketches of Representative Michigan Men

Member of the U.S. House of Representatives from Michigan's 10th district
- In office October 15, 1901 – March 3, 1903
- Preceded by: Rousseau Owen Crump
- Succeeded by: George A. Loud

Auditor General of Michigan
- In office 1887–1890
- Preceded by: William C. Stevens
- Succeeded by: George W. Stone

Personal details
- Born: Henry Harrison Aplin; April 15, 1841 Thetford Township, Michigan
- Died: July 23, 1910 Bay City, Michigan, U.S.
- Resting place: Elm Lawn Cemetery
- Party: Republican

Military service
- Rank: Second Lieutenant
- Battles/wars: American Civil War

Henry Harrison "Tip" Aplin (April 15, 1841 – July 23, 1910) was an American Civil War veteran, businessman, and politician from the U.S. state of Michigan. He served one term in the United States House of Representatives from 1901 to 1903.

== Early life and military career ==
Aplin was born in Thetford Township, Michigan, and moved with his parents to Flint in 1848 where he attended the public schools. In the American Civil War, he enlisted on July 3, 1861, in Company C, Sixteenth Regiment, Michigan Volunteer Infantry, and served until July 16, 1865, with the rank of second lieutenant.

== Political career ==
After the war, Aplin returned to Michigan and engaged in mercantile pursuits at Wenona (later West Bay City and now part of Bay City). He was postmaster of West Bay City from November 1869 to June 1886. He served as township clerk and township treasurer, each for three years and was a delegate to the 1884 Republican National Convention at Chicago.

Aplin was elected auditor general of the State in 1886 and 1888. He became interested in the construction of the electric railways of West Bay City and served as general manager until 1891. He was a member of the Michigan State House of Representatives in 1894 and 1895 and was again appointed postmaster of West Bay City, serving from October 1, 1898, to June 1902.

=== Congress ===
Due to the vacancy caused by the death of Rousseau O. Crump, Aplin was elected as a Republican from Michigan's 10th congressional district to the United States House of Representatives for the Fifty-seventh Congress. Aplin served from October 15, 1901 to March 3, 1903, and was an unsuccessful candidate for re-nomination in 1902, being defeated by fellow Republican George A. Loud.

== After politics ==
After leaving Congress, Aplin engaged in agricultural pursuits and was also interested in the manufacture of ice.

== Death ==
He died in Bay City on July 23, 1910, aged 69, and is interred in Elm Lawn Cemetery.

Political offices
Preceded by William C. Stevens	Michigan Auditor General; 1887–1890	Succeeded by George W. Stone
U.S. House of Representatives
Preceded by Rousseau O. Crump	United States Representative for the 10th congressional district of Michigan; 1901–1903	Succeeded by George A. Loud
