= Deborah Chase Hopkins =

American business executive

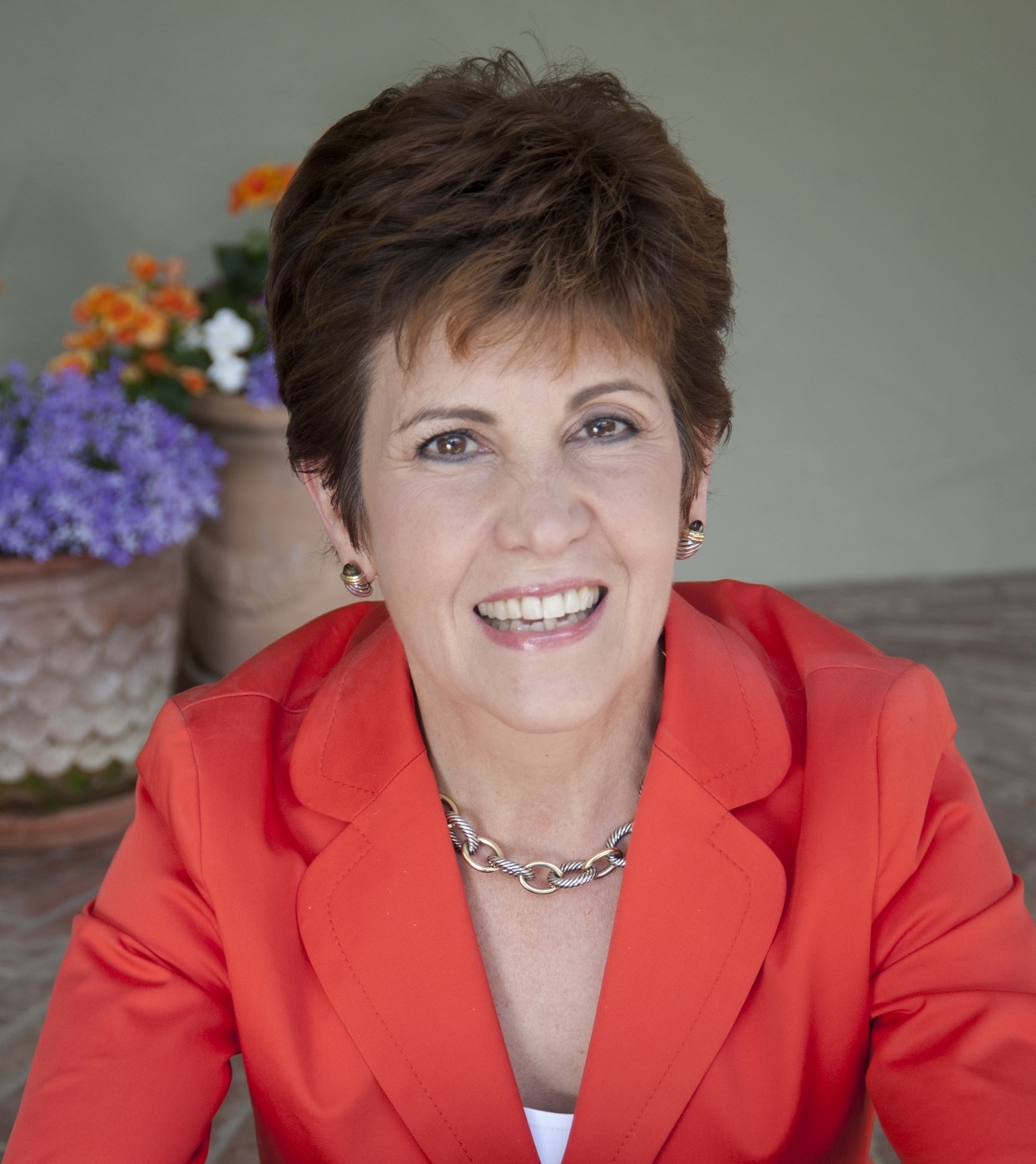

Deborah C. Hopkins is CEO of Double Chase Advisors and is an independent corporate board member. She was Citigroup's Chief Innovation Officer, a position she held beginning in 2008, and CEO of Citi Ventures beginning in 2010. She retired from Citigroup, effective December 31, 2016.

== Biography ==
Deborah Chase Hitch was born on November 12, 1954, in Milwaukee, Wisconsin, to Edward Franklin "Frank" Hitch and Gretchen Luise Cloos, the third of four children. She graduated from Seaholm High School in Birmingham, Michigan, and attended Michigan State University for two years before returning home to help with the family business and receiving a BA in Accounting from Walsh College in 1977.

== Career ==
Hopkins started her career at National Bank of Detroit, then worked for five years at Ford as a financial analyst evaluating costs for various tractor models. From there she moved to Burroughs, again in finance; the firm later merged with Sperry to become Unisys. After 13 years at Unisys, as Corporate Controller and General Manager of Global Services, she became General Auditor of General Motors, eventually moving to Switzerland as Chief Financial Officer of General Motors Europe.

From 1998 to 2000, Hopkins was Chief Financial Officer for The Boeing Company. Hopkins then moved to Lucent Technologies as Chief Financial Officer. The company did not do well and she was fired after one year.

=== Citigroup ===
Hopkins joined Citigroup in 2003 as Head of Strategy, later becoming the firm's Chief Operations & Technology Officer in 2005, and a senior advisor to the Global Investment Bank. In 2008, she became the first-ever Chief Innovation Officer, in the firm's 200-year history. She also served as Chairman of Venture Capital Initiatives seeking investment opportunities that support and enhance her mission.

== Service and awards ==
Hopkins serves as a member of the board for Union Pacific, Marsh & McLennan, and VentureWell.

Hopkins also serves on the board of the Global Women's Leadership Network (GWLN), a non-profit project of Santa Clara University's Leavey School of Business dedicated to women-led initiatives for social justice and economic sustainability, and on the board of Computers for Youth (CFY), and the Green Music Center at Sonoma State University.

Hopkins is an Advisory Board Member at Stanford Technology Venture Program and Riverwood Capital, as well as an Executive Fellow at UC Berkeley’s Haas School of Business.

Hopkins previously served as a board member or director to Qlik Technologies and DuPont.

A sought-after speaker and mentor, Fortune magazine has twice named Hopkins one of the most powerful women in American business (No. 2 in 2000, No. 6 in 1999), and in 2011 and 2012 she was named to the Institutional Investor's top Tech 50 list.
