= Doug A. Ringler =

American accountant

Doug Ringler

Auditor General of Michigan
- Incumbent
- Assumed office June 9, 2014
- Governor: Rick Snyder; Gretchen Whitmer
- Preceded by: Thomas H. McTavish

Personal details
- Born: Reed City, Michigan, U.S.
- Education: Ferris State University (BS)

Doug A. Ringler is the Michigan Auditor General.

Ringler was appointed by the Michigan Legislature effective June 9, 2014. Ringler has held positions in state government for 26 years as of 2019. Ringer was named "Internal Auditor of the Year" by the Institute of Internal Auditors.

Political offices
Preceded by Thomas H. McTavish	Auditor General of Michigan; 2014–present	Incumbent
