= Henry Howard (Detroit politician) =

American politician

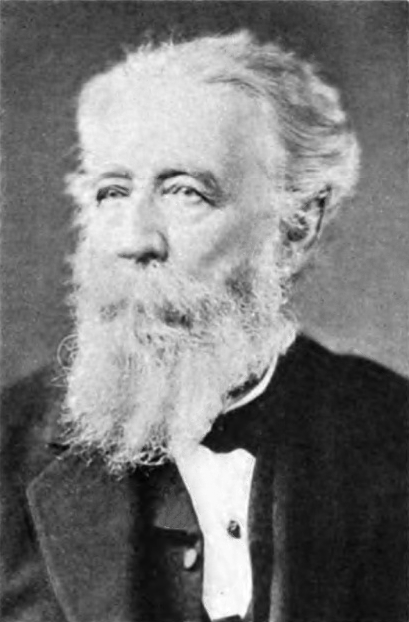

Treasurer of Michigan
- In office 1836–1839
- Preceded by: Robert Abbott (Territorial Treasurer)
- Succeeded by: Peter Desnoyers

Mayor of Detroit
- In office 1837–1837
- Preceded by: Levi Cook
- Succeeded by: Augustus Seymour Porter

Personal details
- Born: September 15, 1801 Hinsdale, Massachusetts
- Died: July 15, 1878 (aged 76) Buffalo, New York

Henry Howard (September 15, 1801 – July 15, 1878) was a banker and businessman, and served as mayor of Detroit in 1837, and as the first treasurer of the state of Michigan.

== Biography ==
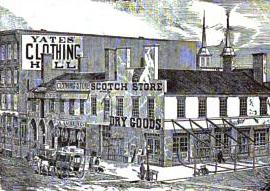
Smart Block, Detroit, where Howard and Wadhams had a dry goods store. The image is c. 1845, after Howard and Wadhams had moved on.

Henry Howard was born in Hinsdale, Massachusetts on September 15, 1801. He later moved to Geneva, New York. In 1827, Howard entered into a partnership with Ralph Wadhams to form Howard and Wadhams (a third partner, W. S. DeZeng, stayed in New York and was not active in the business for the five years he was associated with Howard and Wadhams). Ralph Wadhams had lived in Detroit since 1823, operating a dry goods store in the Smart Block on the corner of Jefferson and Woodward with another business partner. Wadhams was looking to form a new partnership, covering the dry goods store and expanding into the timber business.

Howard and Wadhams purchased timberland and a sawmill in St. Clair County, and Howard moved to Detroit to manage the firm. The firm distributed their product at the mill, and in Detroit, with a warehouse at the foot of Randolph Street. In 1829, Wadhams moved to St. Clair County, near the mill, leaving Howard in Detroit, and in 1832, DeZeng sold his portion of the partnership to Wadhams and Howard. Howard and Wadhams piled up $30,000 ($936,290 in 2025) worth of debt by 1835. They still need to purchase pine forest for timber production, however, and due to overspending and the financial panic of 1837, were forced to assign assets to their creditors in 1839, after which the company was dissolved. In 1840, Ralph Wadhams' father, a wealthy businessman from New York, personally intervened to save his son's business from creditors, and in 1844 reconveyed some of the lumber firm's assets to his son, who continued to run the firm without Henry Howard.

While in Detroit, Howard was a Democrat, although later in life he switched political parties and became a Republican. He served as an alderman of Detroit in 1833 – 1834 and as mayor in 1837. He was the first treasurer of the state of Michigan, serving from 1836 – 1839 and also served as state Auditor General from 1839 – 1840.

In 1840, Howard moved to Buffalo, New York, to join the Buffalo Savings Bank. He worked as treasurer of the Buffalo Savings Bank for nearly thirty years, and died in Buffalo on July 15, 1878.

== Notes ==
- The Detroit mayor, banker, lumberman, and state treasurer Henry Howard is not the same person as the nearly contemporaneous Port Huron, Michigan mayor, banker, lumberman, and state representative Henry Howard, despite Palmer's understandable confusion of the two. Bingham correctly differentiates the two men in his thumbnail biography.

Political offices
Preceded by Levi Cook	Mayor of Detroit; 1837	Succeeded by Augustus Seymour Porter
Preceded by Original officeholder	State Treasurer of Michigan; 1836–1839	Succeeded by Peter Desnoyers
Preceded by Robert Abbott	Michigan Auditor General; 1839–1840	Succeeded by Eurotus P. Hastings
