= Marshall Chapin =

American physician and politician (1798–1836)

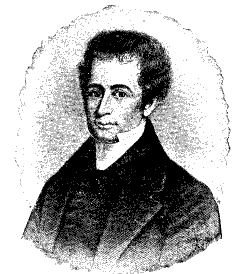

Mayor of Detroit
- In office 1829–1829
- Preceded by: John R. Williams
- Succeeded by: Levi Cook

Mayor of Detroit
- In office 1831–1831
- Preceded by: Levi Cook
- Succeeded by: Charles Christopher Trowbridge

Personal details
- Born: February 27, 1798 Bernardston, Massachusetts
- Died: December 26, 1836 (aged 38) Detroit, Michigan
- Spouse: Mary Crosby
- Education: Geneva Academy

Marshall Chapin (February 27, 1798 – December 26, 1836) was a medical doctor, pharmacist, and public servant from Detroit, Michigan.

== Early life ==
Marshall Chapin was born in Bernardston, Massachusetts in 1798, one of nine children of Dr. Caleb Chapin and his wife Mary. The family later moved to Caledonia, New York, where Marshall went to school. He took a medical course at Geneva Academy (now Hobart and William Smith Colleges), and studied medicine with an uncle in Buffalo, New York. He received his medical degree in 1819.

In 1823, Chapin married Mary Crosby. The couple had four children: Louisa, Helen, Charles, and Marshall.

== Detroit ==
In 1819 Chapin moved to Detroit, and, with the help of his uncle, established the first drugstore there, as well as going into private practice as a physician. He was soon appointed physician for Fort Shelby. He went into public service, serving as an alderman in 1826 and 1827 and mayor in 1831 and 1833. He was appointed City Physician during the cholera epidemic of 1832, and served as same during the second outbreak in 1834.

Marshall Chapin died of heart disease on December 26, 1838. His drugstore continued in business under his son-in-law's name, and others, well into the 1880s.

Political offices
Preceded by John R. Williams	Mayor of Detroit; 1829	Succeeded by Levi Cook
Preceded by Levi Cook	Mayor of Detroit; 1831	Succeeded by Charles Christopher Trowbridge
