= Murl K. Aten =

American politician (1901–1971)

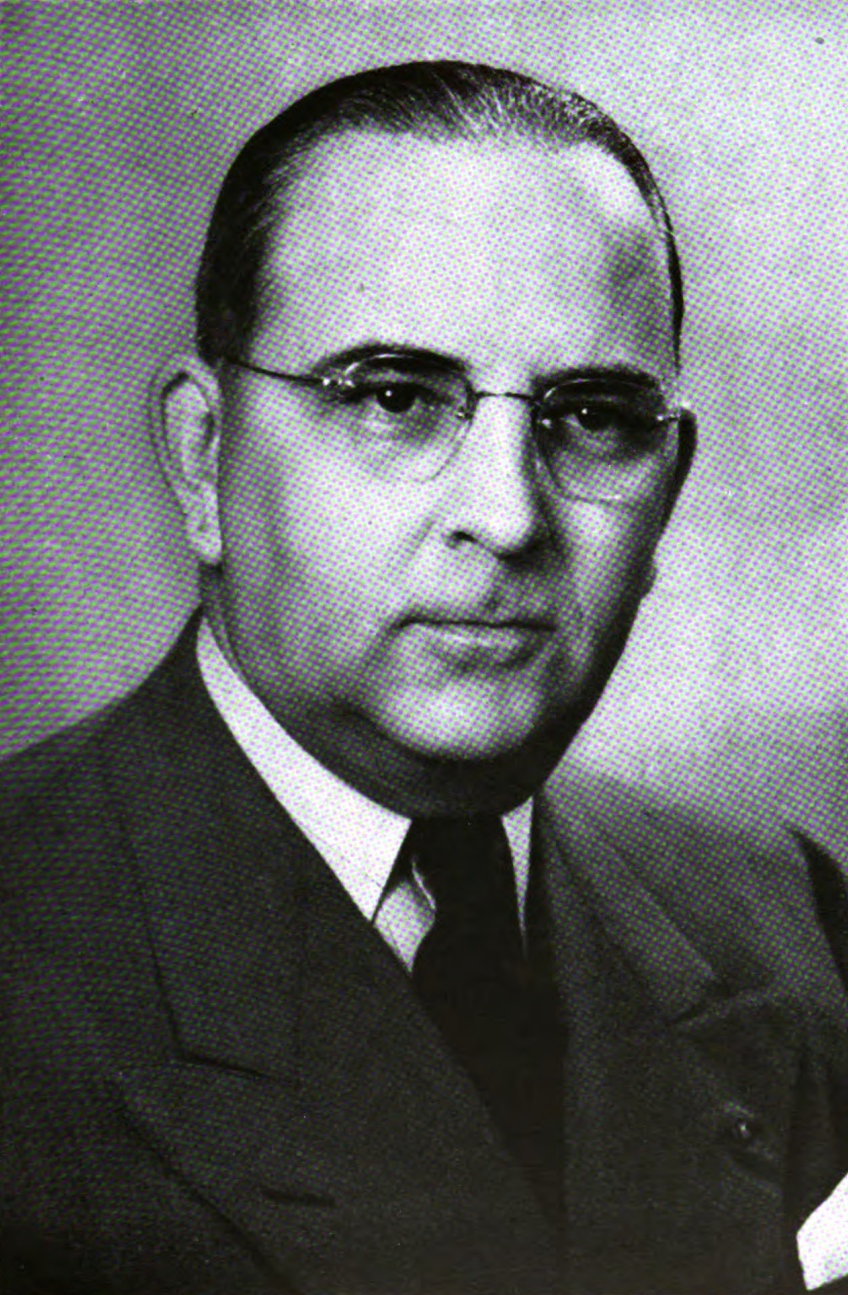

Michigan Auditor General
- In office 1947–1950
- Governor: Kim Sigler; G. Mennen Williams
- Preceded by: John D. Morrison
- Succeeded by: John B. Martin Jr.

Personal details
- Born: August 13, 1901 Norvell, Michigan, US
- Died: June 15, 1971 (aged 69) Sandstone Township, Michigan, US
- Party: Republican

Murl K. Aten (August 13, 1901 – June 15, 1971) was a Michigan politician who served as Michigan Auditor General from 1947 to 1950.

== Early life ==
Aten was born on August 13, 1901, in Norvell, Michigan.

== Career ==
Aten served as Jackson County clerk from 1939 to 1940. He then served as the Jackson County Prosecuting Attorney from 1945 to 1946. Aten served as Michigan Auditor General from 1947 to 1950. In 1950, Aten was an unsuccessful candidate in the Republican primary the position of United States Representative from Michigan's 2nd District.

== Personal life ==
Aten was married and had three children. Aten was a member of the Kiwanis, the Freemasons, and of the Loyal Order of Moose. Aten was Methodist.

== Death ==
Aten died of a heart attack near his home on June 15, 1971, in Sandstone Township, Michigan. He was interred at Roseland Memorial Gardens in Jackson, Michigan.

Party political offices
Preceded by John D. Morrison	Republican nominee for Michigan Auditor General; 1946, 1948	Succeeded by John B. Martin Jr.
