= Charles Trowbridge House =

Historic house in Michigan, United States

- U.S. National Register of Historic Places
- Michigan State Historic Site
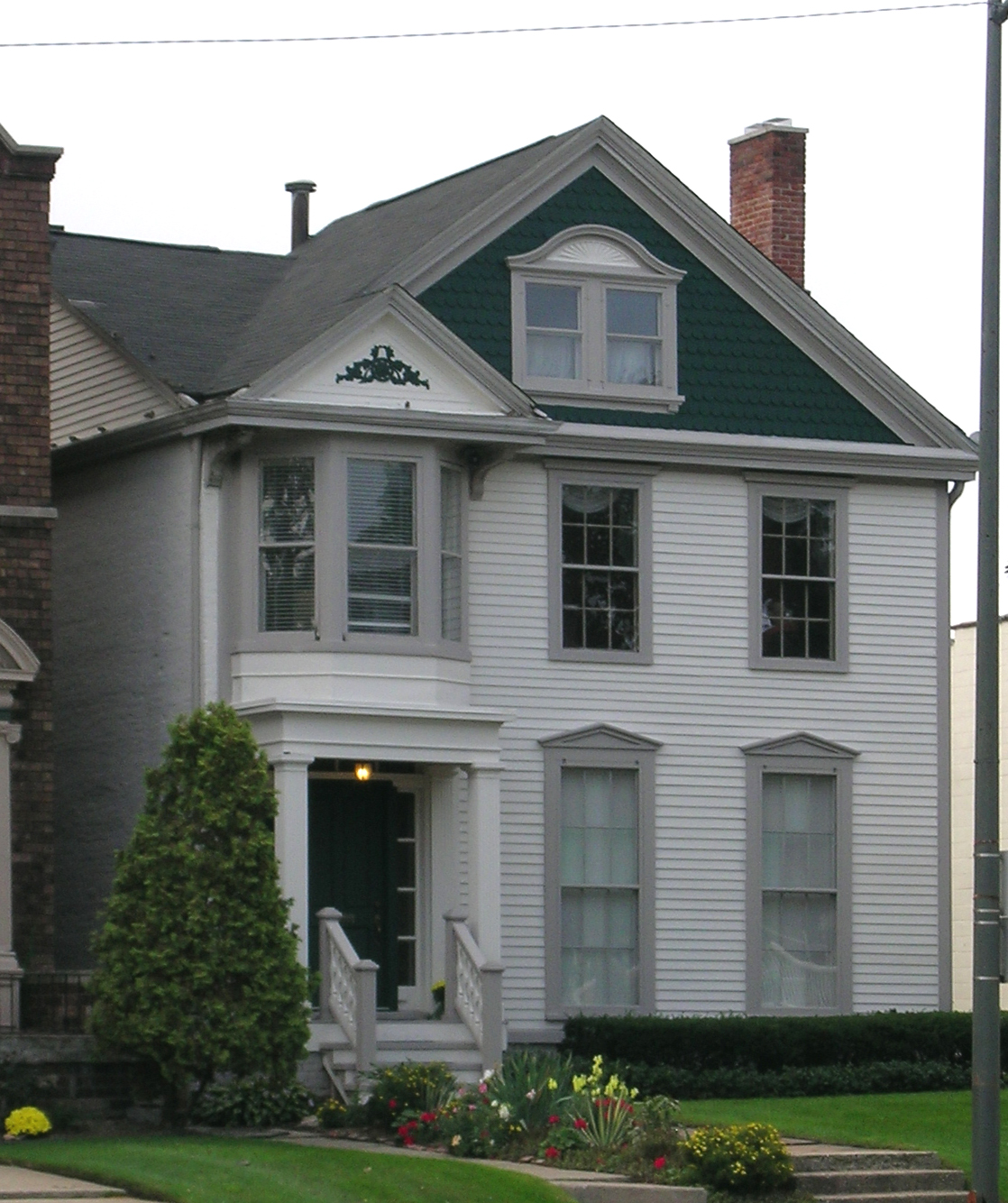

- Location within Michigan Location within the United States
- Interactive map
- Location: 1380 E. Jefferson Ave., Detroit, Michigan
- Coordinates: 42°20′1″N 83°1′58″W
- Area: less than one acre
- Built: 1826
- Architectural style: Federal, Late Victorian
- NRHP reference No.: 76001042

Significant dates
- Added to NRHP: May 28, 1976
- Designated MSHS: July 26, 1974

The Charles C. Trowbridge House is located at 1380 East Jefferson Avenue in Detroit, Michigan. It is the oldest documented building in the city of Detroit; it was designated a Michigan State Historic Site in 1974 and listed on the National Register of Historic Places in 1976.

== History ==
The area where this house sits was originally the Mullett farm, part of a French land grant to Charles Chauvin. Charles Christopher Trowbridge built this house in 1826 at a cost of $2500 on what was then farmland, far from the heart of Detroit. At the time, the River Road (now East Jefferson) ran behind the house; the original access to the house may have been from what is now the rear. Houses of this type often had similar front and rear layouts, with entrances at both ends of a central hallway. In approximately 1850, Trowbridge added a brick addition to the rear of the house. A stable, still extant, was constructed behind the house.

Trowbridge lived in the house for 56 years until his death in 1883. The house, originally built in a Greek Revival style, was updated with Victorian elements such as the bay window in the front. In 1889, the eastern two bays of the house were removed, leaving the current section. An apartment house was built on the site where the bays were removed.

By 1929 Detroit artist Roman Kryzanowski was renting and living in his studio located on this property. He died in his studio on July 31, 1929.

After Trowbridge's death, the house remained in the family, and was converted to a rooming house in 1936. In 1942, the Trowbridge family sold the house to Marie Cavanaugh and it was converted back to a single-family residence. Today, the house is privately owned and houses multiple businesses including Trowbridge Law Firm, Trowbridge Realty, Dickson & Associates and RBD Creative.

== Description ==
When constructed, the house was a five-bay-wide Federal structure with a central entrance. It has since had two bays removed and has been updated with Victorian elements. The house as it stands exhibits a harmonious blend of Federal and Victorian pieces. The front and rear facades are similar, with an entrance in the same place and a connecting hall between. In the front, the entrance is at the left-hand side of the current three-bay-wide facade, and is flanked by sidelights with a rectangular transom above. An overhang shielding the entrance is supported by square Doric columns. Above the entrance is a projecting three-sided bay window, with a pediment decorated with fish-scale shingles.

== See also ==
- National Register of Historic Places listings in Detroit, Michigan
