= Michigan Auditor General =

Political position

The Michigan auditor general is the chief fiscal officer of the State of Michigan.

Under the original 1835 Michigan Constitution, the auditor general was established as an appointed position. Auditors general were appointed by the governor with consent from the state senate. Under the 1850 Michigan Constitution, the auditor general became an elected position. Elections for the position were held every two years. Under the current 1963 state constitution, the position of auditor general returned to be an appointed position. Auditors general are now appointed by the state legislature.

The current Michigan auditor general, Doug A. Ringler, C.P.A, C.I.A, was appointed by the Michigan Legislature effective June 9, 2014.

== List of Michigan auditors general ==
Image	Name	Term	Party / Appointer	Notes	Ref.
	Robert Abbott	1836–1839	Stevens T. Mason	Resigned	
	Henry Howard	1839–1840	Stevens T. Mason		
	Eurotas P. Hastings	1840–1842	William Woodbridge		
	Alpheus Felch	1842	John S. Barry	Resigned	
	Henry L. Whipple	1842	John S. Barry	Acting	
	Charles G. Hammond	1842–1845	John S. Barry	Resigned	
	John J. Adam	1845–1846	John S. Barry		
	Digby V. Bell	1846–1848	Alpheus Felch	Resigned	
	John J. Adam	1848–1851	Epaphroditus Ransom		
	John Swegles, Jr.	1851–1854	Democratic (Note: First elected auditor general of Michigan.)		
	Whitney Jones	1855–1858	Republican		
	Daniel L. Case	1859–1860	Republican		
	Langford G. Berry	1861–1862	Republican		
	Emil Anneke	1863–1866	Republican		
	William Humphrey	1867–1874	Republican		
	Ralph Ely	1875–1878	Republican		
	W. Irving Latimer	1879–1882	Republican		
	William C. Stevens	1883–1886	Republican		
	Henry H. Aplin	1887–1890	Republican		
	George W. Stone	1891–1892	Democratic		
	Stanley W. Turner	1893–1896	Republican		
	Roscoe D. Dix	1897-1900	Republican		
	Perry F. Powers	1901–1904	Republican		
	James B. Bradley	1905–1908	Republican		
	Oramel B. Fuller	1909–1932	Republican		
	John K. Stack, Jr.	1933–1935	Democratic	Died in office	
	John J. O'Hara	1935–1936	Frank Fitzgerald (Note: Appointed to fill vacancy.)		
	George T. Gundry	1937–1938	Democratic		
	Vernon J. Brown	1939–1944	Republican		
	John D. Morrison	1945–1946	Republican		
	Murl K. Aten	1947–1950	Republican		
	John B. Martin, Jr.	1951–1954	Republican		
	Victor Targonski	1955–1956	Democratic	Resigned	
	Frank S. Szymanski	1956–1959	G. Mennen Williams (Note: Appointed to fill a vacancy in 1956, then won in a general election in 1956.)		
	Frank S. Szymanski	1956–1959	Democratic	Resigned	
	William R. Hart	1959	G. Mennen Williams	Acting	
	Otis M. Smith	1959–1961	G. Mennen Williams (Note: Appointed to fill a vacancy in 1959, then won in a general election in 1960.)		
	Otis M. Smith	1959–1961	Democratic	Resigned	
	William A. Burgett	1961	John Swainson	Acting	
	Billie S. Farnum	1961–1964	John Swainson (Note: Appointed to fill a vacancy in 1961, then won in a general election in 1962.)		
	Billie S. Farnum	1961–1964	Democratic		
	Allison Green	1965	George W. Romney	Acting	
	Albert Lee	1965–1982	Michigan Legislature		
	Franklin C. Pinkelman	1982–1989 (Note: Served in an acting capacity until December 1982.)	Michigan Legislature		
	Charles S. Jones	1989	Michigan Legislature	Acting	
	Thomas H. McTavish	1989–2014	Michigan Legislature		
	Doug A. Ringler	2014–present	Michigan Legislature		

== See also ==
- Governor of Michigan
- Michigan Attorney General
- Michigan General Assembly
- Michigan State Capitol
