= Levi Cook =

American politician

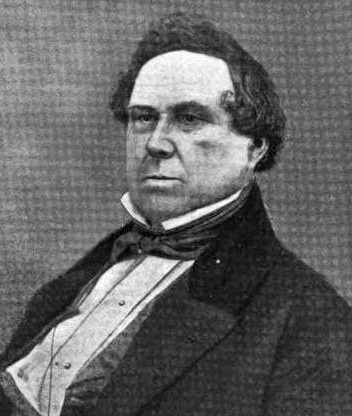

Mayor of Detroit
- In office 1832–1832
- Preceded by: Marshall Chapin
- Succeeded by: Marshall Chapin

Mayor of Detroit
- In office 1835–1836
- Preceded by: Andrew Mack
- Succeeded by: Henry Howard

Personal details
- Born: December 16, 1792 Bellingham, Massachusetts
- Died: December 2, 1866 (aged 73) Detroit, Michigan
- Spouse: Elizabeth Stevens

Levi Cook (December 16, 1792 – December 2, 1866) was an American businessman and politician who served two terms as the mayor of Detroit, Michigan, and one in the Michigan House of Representatives.

Cook was born in Bellingham, Massachusetts, on December 16, 1792, the son of Thadeus Cook. He moved to Detroit in 1815, and that same year became one of the trustees of the city. He also served as City Treasurer in 1822, County Commissioner from 1824–1827, Superintendent of the Poor from 1827–1828, and city alderman in 1828. He was both Treasurer of the Michigan Territory and Chief Engineer of the Fire Department from 1830–1836, mayor of Detroit in 1832, 1835–1836, a member of the Michigan House of Representatives in 1838, and a member of the city Board of Review in 1840–1841. He was originally a Whig, but later in life a Republican.

Cook was a dry goods merchant. He was also a director of the Farmers' and Mechanics' Bank, and served as its president from 1838–1845.

He married Elizabeth Stevens of Boston in 1818, but the couple had no children. Levi Cook died on December 2, 1866.

Political offices
Preceded by Marshall Chapin	Mayor of Detroit; 1832	Succeeded by Marshall Chapin
Preceded by Andrew Mack	Mayor of Detroit; 1835–1836	Succeeded by Henry Howard
