= 8th Michigan Infantry Regiment =

- Michigan state flag
- Active: September 23, 1861, to June 30, 1865
- Country: United States
- Allegiance: Union
- Branch: Infantry
- Engagements: Port Royal Expedition; James Island, S.C.; Battle of Secessionville; Second Battle of Bull Run; Battle of Chantilly; Battle of South Mountain; Battle of Antietam; Battle of Fredericksburg; Siege of Vicksburg; Knoxville Campaign; Battle of the Wilderness; Battle of Spotsylvania Court House; Battle of Cold Harbor; Siege of Petersburg; Battle of the Crater

The 8th Michigan Infantry Regiment was an infantry regiment that served in the Union Army during the American Civil War.

== Service ==
The 8th Michigan Infantry was organized at Grand Rapids and Detroit, Michigan and mustered into Federal service for a three-year enlistment on September 23, 1861.

The Eight Michigan was known as the "Wandering Regiment" for its service on many fronts and its frequent reassignments between different armies and geographical areas. The regiment began its service by being assigned to General Thomas W. Sherman in South Carolina where he was establishing a beachhead to provide a base for the naval blockade. From there the regiment went to Virginia and was assigned to General Burnside's 9th Corps. The Eighth saw service in both the eastern and western theaters of operation. The Eighth fought in several major battles in the east, was then sent to support General Grant at Vicksburg, and finally being dispatched to east Tennessee before finishing out the war with the Army of the Potomac in Virginia.

The regiment was mustered out on June 30, 1865.

== Total strength and casualties ==
The regiment suffered 11 officers and 212 enlisted men who were killed in action or mortally wounded and 3 officers and 223 enlisted men who died of disease, for a total of 449 fatalities.

== Commanders ==
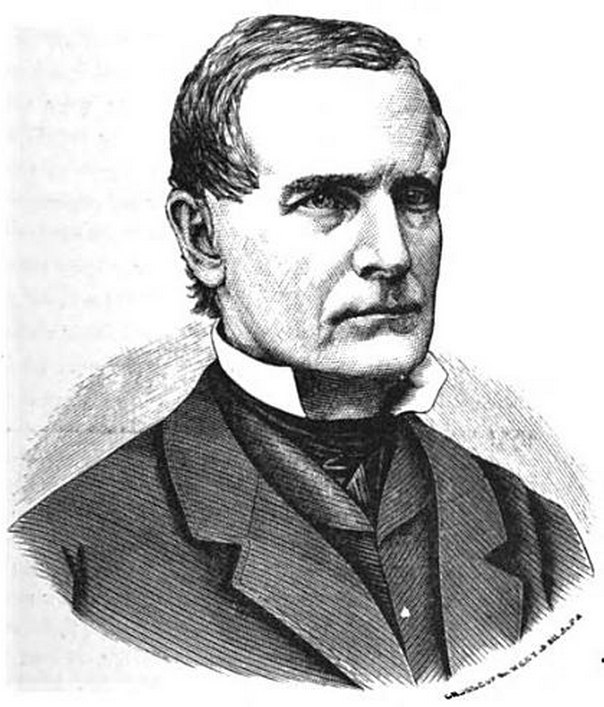
Colonel William M. Fenton

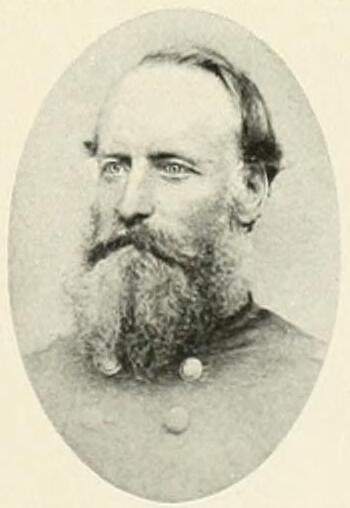
Colonel Ralph Ely

- Colonel William M. Fenton
- Colonel Ralph Ely

== See also ==
- List of Michigan Civil War Units
- Michigan in the American Civil War
