= Isaac G. Burnet =

American politician

Isaac Gouverneur Burnet was a Mayor of Cincinnati, Ohio. He was born on July 7, 1784, in Newark, Essex County, New Jersey.

Burnet moved to Cincinnati in 1804. He married Keturah Wynne Gordon in 1807. They had 11 children.

Isaac G. Burnet was chosen mayor April, 1819. "Mayor Burnet was a man of more than ordinary ability and tact", as was manifest in the fact that he served the city as chief executive until 1827. In 1829 Isaac G. Burnet was again re-elected mayor, the total vote cast being 2,628. In 1827 the city was divided into five wards, and the division so continued until 1838.

He died on March 11, 1856, in Walnut Hills, Cincinnati, Ohio. His body was moved in 1856 from Presbyterian Church cemetery at 12th Street to the new Spring Grove Cemetery in Cincinnati, Ohio.
