= Lake Ashmere =

Lake in Hinsdale, Massachusetts, USA

- Ashmere Lake
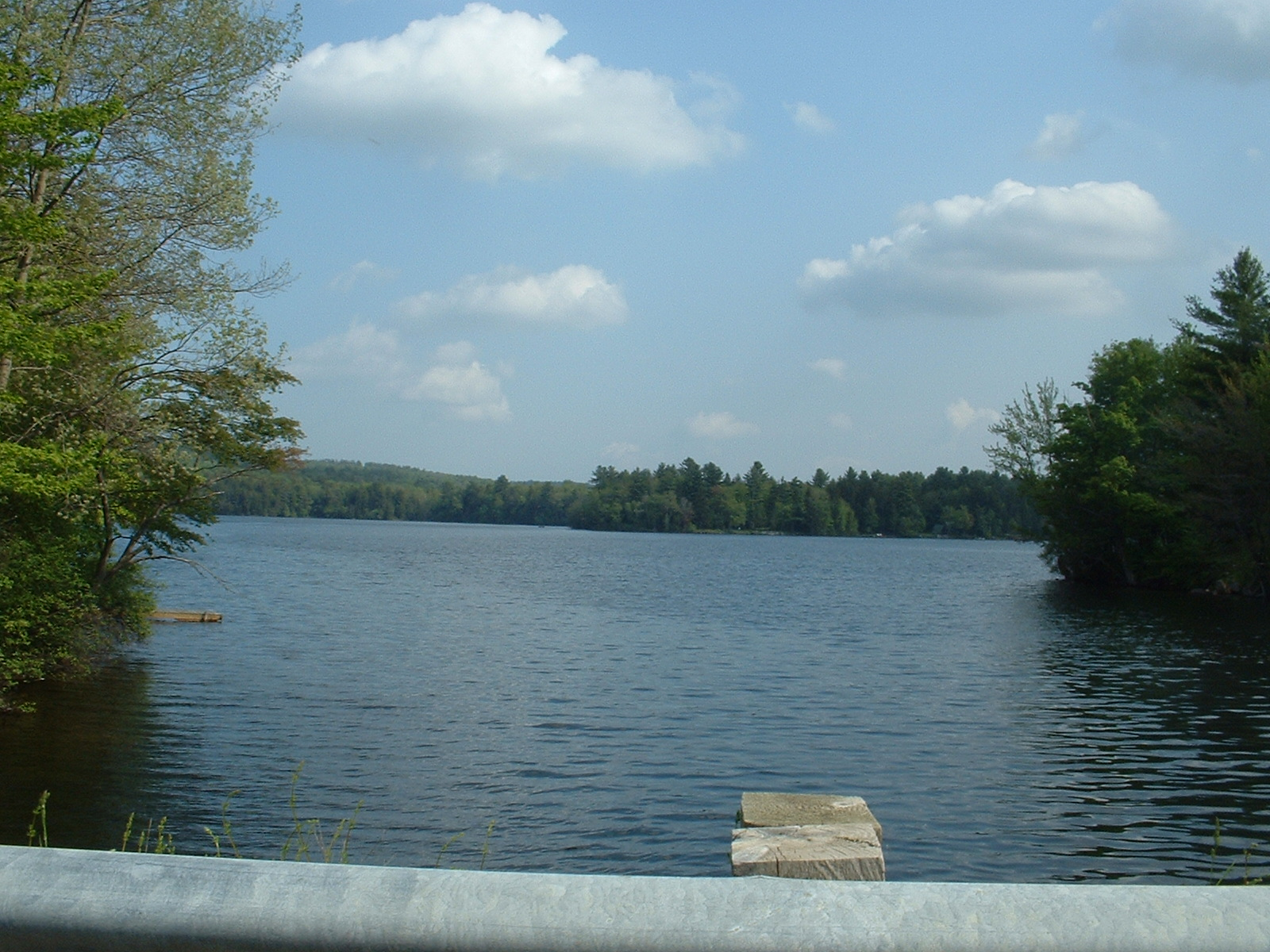
- Ashmere Lake

- Location within Massachusetts Location within the United States
- Location: Berkshire County, Massachusetts
- Coordinates: 42.436°N 73.083°W
- Type: Reservoir
- Catchment area: 4.6 sq mi (12 km^{2})
- Basin countries: United States
- Surface area: 287 acres (116 ha)
- Average depth: 8 feet (2.4 m)
- Max. depth: 24 feet (7.3 m)
- Water volume: 2,076 acre⋅ft (2,561,000 m^{3})
- Surface elevation: 1,581 ft (482 m)
- Dam: Ashmere Lake Dam
- Islands: 2 (1 on north side, 1 on south side)
- References: https://www.mass.gov/files/documents/2016/08/wh/dfwashmere.pdf

Lake Ashmere, or Ashmere Lake, is a small lake in rural Berkshire County of Massachusetts, located in Peru and Hinsdale, Massachusetts.

== Usage ==
Lake Ashmere is used mostly for recreational purposes. It is owned by the Commonwealth of Massachusetts. There are three summer camps located on the lake: Camp Danbee, a private girls camp, on the south side and Camp Taconic, a private co-ed camp on the north side of the lake. A third summer camp, Camp Ashmere, a co-ed church operated camp located on the south side of the lake, closed after the Summer 2018 season, and its land was put up for sale, and sold to the new Berkshire Lake Camp. The Berkshire Lake Camp was supposed to open for the summer of 2020, however it was delayed due to the COVID-19 pandemic until the summer of 2021.

== Ashmere Lake Dam ==
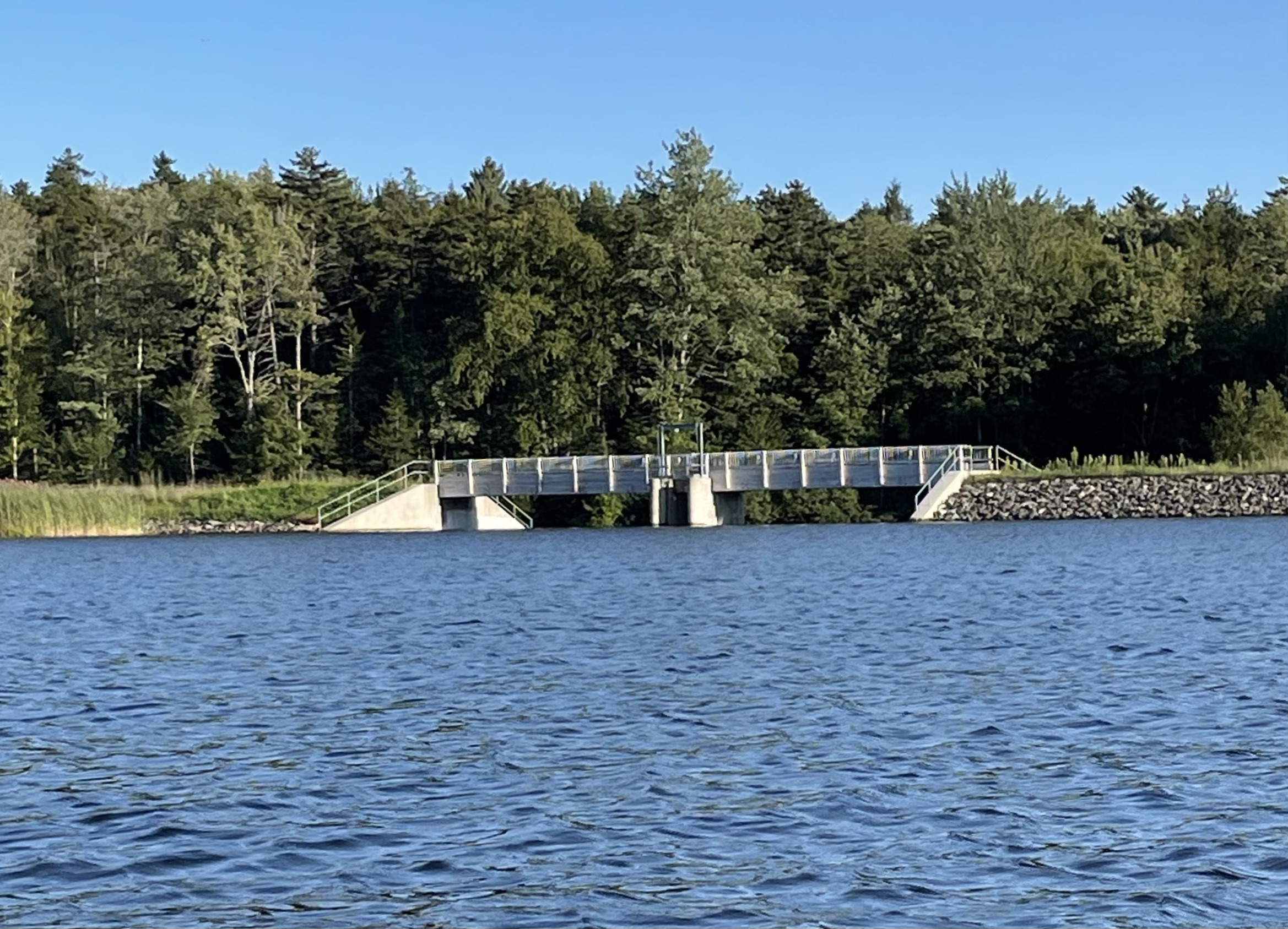
Lake Ashmere Dam, facing south from a kayak.

Ashmere Lake Dam is of earthen construction, a gravity dam. Its length is 1,525 feet (465 m). Its capacity is 3,872 acre-feet (4,776,000 m^{3}). Normal storage is 2,076 acre-feet (2,561,000 m^{3}). It drains an area of 4.6 square miles (12 km^{2}).

== Exact location ==
The lake is divided by Route 143 which cuts it approximately in half. There is access between the two sides via an aqueduct that is approximately 6 feet (1.8 m) in width with a depth of water of about 3 feet (0.91 m). The easiest way to access the lake is by taking Route 143 north from Route 8 in Hinsdale, from which you can take exits to access vacation and permanent homes on the lake. There is only one public access which is on the extreme south corner of the lake.
