= W. Irving Latimer =

American politician

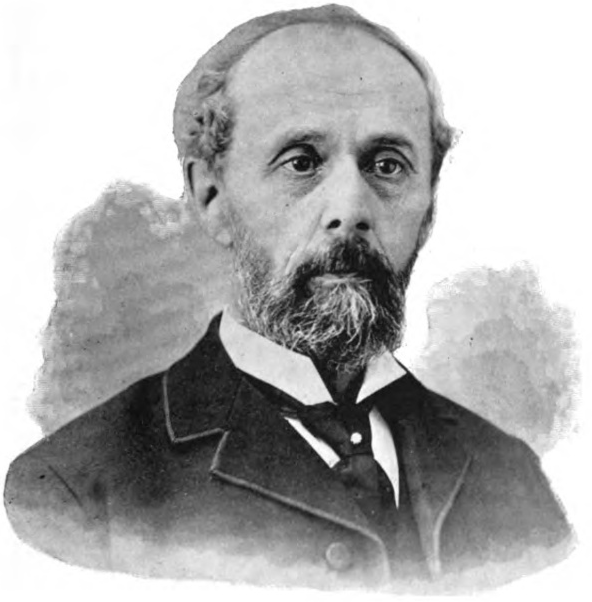

Member of the Michigan Senate from the 25th district
- In office January 1, 1897 – 1900
- Preceded by: Edwin O. Shaw
- Succeeded by: Ellery Channing Cannon

Member of the Michigan House of Representatives from the Mecosta County district
- In office January 1, 1895 – 1896

Michigan Auditor General
- In office 1879–1882
- Governor: Charles Croswell
- Preceded by: Ralph Ely
- Succeeded by: William C. Stevens

Mayor of Big Rapids, Michigan
- In office 1870–1870

Personal details
- Born: August 5, 1836 Dutchess County, New York
- Died: April 19, 1922 (aged 85) Portland, Oregon
- Party: Republican
- Spouse: Olivia Spencer Cobb
- Children: 1

William Irving Latimer (August 5, 1836 – April 19, 1922) was a Michigan politician.

== Early life ==
Latimer was born on August 5, 1836, in Dutchess County, New York. Latimer attended school in Poughkeepsie, New York.

== Career ==
Latimer moved to Newaygo, Michigan to work for the Newaygo Lumber Company, where he worked from 1859 to 1865. Latimer served as the Mecosta County treasurer for three terms. Latimer served as the mayor of Big Rapids, Michigan in 1870. In 1876, he was a member of Michigan Republican State Central Committee. Latimer served as Michigan Auditor General from 1879 to 1982. On November 6, 1894, Latimer was elected as a member of the Michigan House of Representatives, where he represented Mecosta County and served from January 2, 1895, to 1896. On November 3, 1896, Latimer was elected as a member of the Michigan Senate, where he represented the 25th district served from January 6, 1897, to 1900.

== Personal life ==
Latimer married Olivia Spencer Cobb on April 8, 1863, in Kent County, Michigan. Together they had one daughter. Latimer was Episcopalian. Latimer was a Freemason.

== Death ==
Latimer died on April 19, 1922, in Portland, Oregon.
