= Camp Danbee =

Summer camp in Peru, Massachusetts, US

- Interactive map of Camp Danbee
- Location: Peru, Massachusetts
- Coordinates: 42.4454°N 73.0753°W
- Elevation: 1653 feet
- Type: All Girls Residential Summer Camp
- Established: 1950
- Website: campdanbee.com

Camp Danbee is an all girls youth summer camp located on the south side of Lake Ashmere in Peru, Massachusetts. It was founded in 1950 and has operated continuously annually since then. Camp Danbee is located in Western Massachusetts and is about three hour from both New York City and Boston.

== Community service ==
Camp Danbee has hosted several different special camp events and weeks for children who have been impacted by the Sandy Hook shooting, and children whose parents were killed during the 9/11 attacks.

=== Seas Stars North ===
Camp Sea Star is a one day free camp for children who went to Sandy Hook Elementary School, or had friends or family who were killed in the December 14th attack.

=== America's Camp ===
America's Camp is a free sleepaway camp for kids impacted by the attacks on 9/11. It provided a save space for children who lost parents and relatives during the 9/11 attacks. This camp helped teach children that they were not alone in their grief. America's Camp was features by the Boston Globe in a 2011 YouTube video. America's Camp operated annually for a week in late August from 2002 until 2011. Hillary Clinton spoke at an event for the American Camp Association in March 2015, and specifically thanked America's Camp for creating a "nurturing and fun experience"

== COVID-19 impact ==
During the 2020 summer season, Camp Danbee and Camp Mah-Kee-Nac created a 'family camp' where families rented cabins for half a week, and participated in outdoor activities and small group games.
