= Otis M. Smith =

American judge

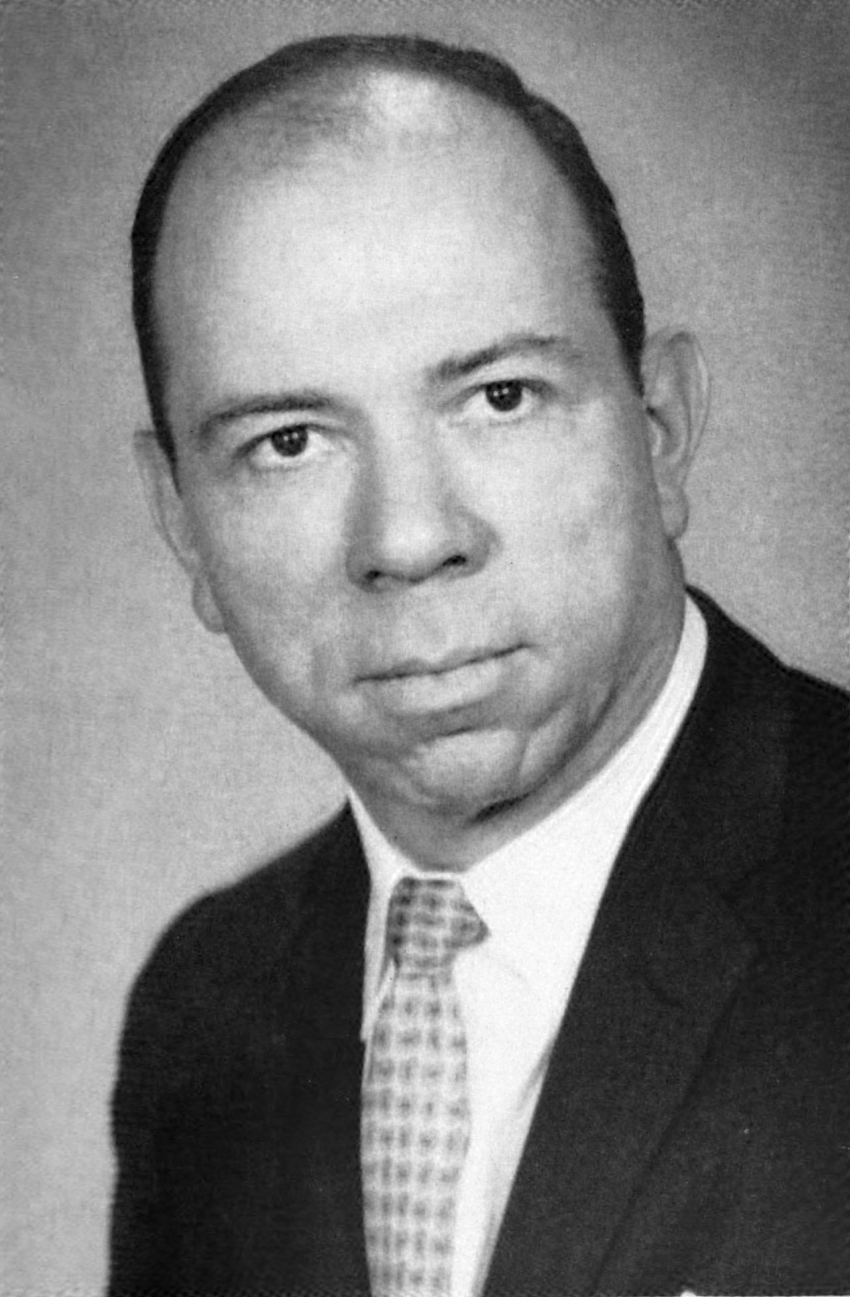

214th Regent of the University of Michigan
- In office March 7, 1967 – 1970
- Preceded by: Allan R. Sorenson

78th Justice of the Michigan Supreme Court
- In office 1961 – December 31, 1966
- Appointed by: John Swainson
- Preceded by: Talbot Smith
- Succeeded by: Thomas E. Brennan

36th Michigan Auditor General
- In office October 21, 1959 – October 9, 1961
- Governor: G. Mennen Williams; John Swainson
- Preceded by: William R. Hart (acting)
- Succeeded by: William A. Burgett (acting)

Personal details
- Born: Otis Milton Smith; February 20, 1922 Memphis, Tennessee
- Died: June 29, 1994 (aged 72) Detroit

Otis Milton Smith (February 20, 1922 – June 29, 1994) was the first African American justice on the Michigan Supreme Court and the General Counsel for General Motors.

Smith graduated from law school at The Catholic University of America in 1950, where he was a member of the first volume of the school's Law Review.

He then went to Flint, Michigan, where he engaged in private practice until 1957. At that time he was appointed to the Michigan Public Service Commission. His reputation for fighting graft there earned him a nickname: "the man who shot Santa Claus."

From 1959 until 1961 Smith served as Michigan Auditor General.

He was appointed a justice of the Michigan Supreme Court in 1961 by Governor John Swainson He retained his seat in the 1962 election but lost re-election in 1966, and was then hired by General Motors. He would rise to become vice-president and General Counsel. In 1968, Smith served as a presidential elector. In 1983, his portrait was dedicated at the Michigan Supreme Court. A portrait also hangs in the admissions of The Catholic University of America, Columbus School of Law.

A scholarship in his name is administered by the Community Foundation for Southeast Michigan. It is given to a single mother, and can be used for tuition at Wayne State University, any campus of the University of Michigan, or the law school at The Catholic University of America.

== See also ==
- List of African-American jurists

== Sources ==
- Michigan Supreme Court Historical Society
- Flint Public Library
- Michigan Bar Journal
- 1990 interview with Roger F. Lane

== Endnotes ==
Party political offices
Preceded by Frank S. Szymanski	Democratic nominee for Michigan Auditor General; 1960	Succeeded by Billie S. Farnum
Political offices
Preceded by William R. Hart	Michigan Auditor General; 1959–1961	Succeeded by William A. Burgett
