= Ralph Ely =

American politician and military officer (1820–1883)

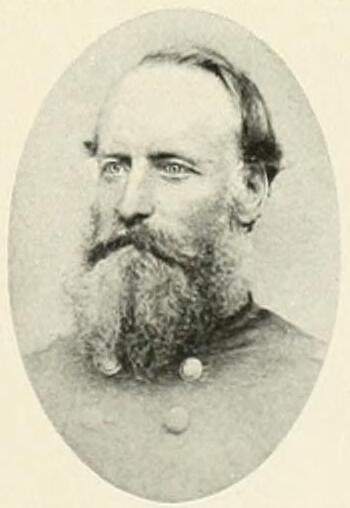
- Portrait of Ely in a 1911 publication

Michigan Auditor General
- In office 1875–1878
- Preceded by: William Humphrey
- Succeeded by: W. Irving Latimer

Member of the Michigan Senate from the 26th district
- In office 1873–1874
- Preceded by: Alfred B. Wood
- Succeeded by: Isaac A. Fancher

Personal details
- Born: July 10, 1820 Marshall, New York, U.S.
- Died: April 12, 1883 (aged 62) Readmond, Michigan, U.S.
- Party: Democratic; Republican
- Spouse: Mary E. Halstead
- Children: 6, including Townsend
- Occupation: Politician; military officer; farmer; lumberer; merchant

Ralph Ely (July 10, 1820 – April 12, 1883) was an American politician and military officer from Michigan. He was the first settler of Alma, Michigan, and served as a colonel in the Union Army and was brevetted brigadier general. He served as a member of the Michigan Senate from 1873 to 1874 and as Michigan Auditor General from 1875 to 1878.

== Early life ==
Ralph Ely was born on July 10, 1820, in Marshall, New York. Around the age of two, the family moved to Stockton, New York. He attended district school and worked on his father's farm. He lived in Indiana for two years and then returned to his father's house for three years.

== Career ==
In 1846, Ely moved to Ronald Township, Michigan. In 1854, he was the first settler of Elyton (later Alma). Ely and his family settled on the Pine River. In the first six years there, he engaged in farming, lumbering, and mercantile businesses. He owned a general store and built the first grist and saw mills in Alma. In 1860, he was elected as county treasurer of Gratiot County.

At the outbreak of the Civil War, Ely recruited a company and served as the captain of company C of the 8th Michigan Infantry Regiment. He was promoted to major, lieutenant colonel, and finally colonel of the regiment. He was promoted by President Abraham Lincoln for "meritorious conduct". On April 2, 1865, he was made brevetted brigadier general following "conspicuous gallantry" at the Siege of Petersburg. He remained in service until June 1, 1866. Following the war, Ely was the superintendent of the emigration of freedmen from South Carolina and their settlement on government land in Florida. He then returned home to Gratiot County and engaged in lumbering.

In early life, Ely was a Democrat and then he associated with the Republican Party. He represented the 26th district in the Michigan Senate from 1873 to 1874. He was elected as Michigan Auditor General in 1874 and was re-elected in 1876. Following his term, he continued lumbering and farming near Cross Village and moved to Emmet County.

== Personal life ==
Ely married Mary E. Halstead. They had five daughters and one son, Louise, Josephine, Lucy, Kate, Electa, and Townsend. Ely served in the same company as Townsend in the Civil War. His son was also a state senator.

Ely died on April 12, 1883, in Readmond.
