= Amanda Smith (disambiguation) =

Amanda Smith (1837–1915) was an African-American evangelist.

Amanda or Mandy Smith may also refer to:

- Amanda Smith (academic), New Zealand design academic
- Amanda Abbington, (born Amanda Jane Smith, 1974), English actress
- Amanda Barnes Smith (1809–1886), Mormon pioneer and heroine
- Amanda Smith (fl. 1925), founder of Mrs. Smith's, a US pie manufacturer
- Amanda Smith (broadcaster), presenter of Australian radio program Sporty
- Amanda Smith (Miss Pennsylvania), American beauty pageant titleholder, Miss Pennsylvania 2014
- Mandy Smith (field hockey) (born 1972), New Zealand field hockey player
- Mandy Smith (born 1970), English dance-pop singer and former model
