= South Center School House =

- U.S. National Register of Historic Places
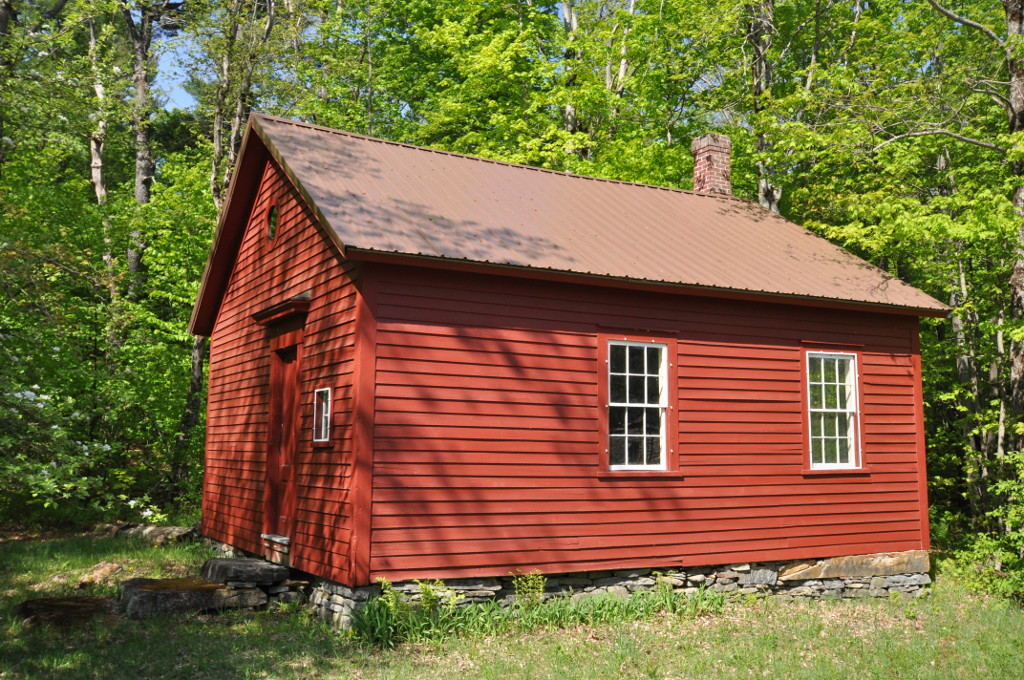

- Location within Massachusetts Location within the United States
- Location: Washington, Massachusetts
- Coordinates: 42°21′0″N 73°7′33″W
- Built: 1880
- Architectural style: Greek Revival
- MPS: Washington MRA
- NRHP reference No.: 86002144
- Added to NRHP: September 12, 1986

The South Center School House is a historic one-room school house on Washington Mountain Road in Washington, Massachusetts. Built in 1880, it is the town's only surviving district school building. It was listed on the National Register of Historic Places in 1986.

== Description and history ==
The South Center School House is located on the north side of Washington Mountain Road, roughly midway between the town's Upper and Lower, and just south of the road's crossing of Savery Brook. It is a small rectangular wood-frame structure, with a gable roof, clapboard siding, and rubblestone foundation. Its main (southeast facing) facade has an off-center entry with a broad lintel, a small 2-over-2 window just to its right, and a small round window in the gable above. The side facades each have two sash windows. The interior of the building houses two small cloakrooms and a single classroom.

The school was built in 1880 at the site of the town's first school for $300, and was one of the town's seven district schools. Washington's population was in a period of decline in the early 20th century, and the school closed in 1922. It then stood vacant for many years, and was restored by the local historic commission in the 1970s.

== See also ==
- National Register of Historic Places listings in Berkshire County, Massachusetts
- Upper Historic District (Washington, Massachusetts)
