= Ionisation (Varèse) =

Musical composition by Edgard Varèse

- by Edgard Varèse
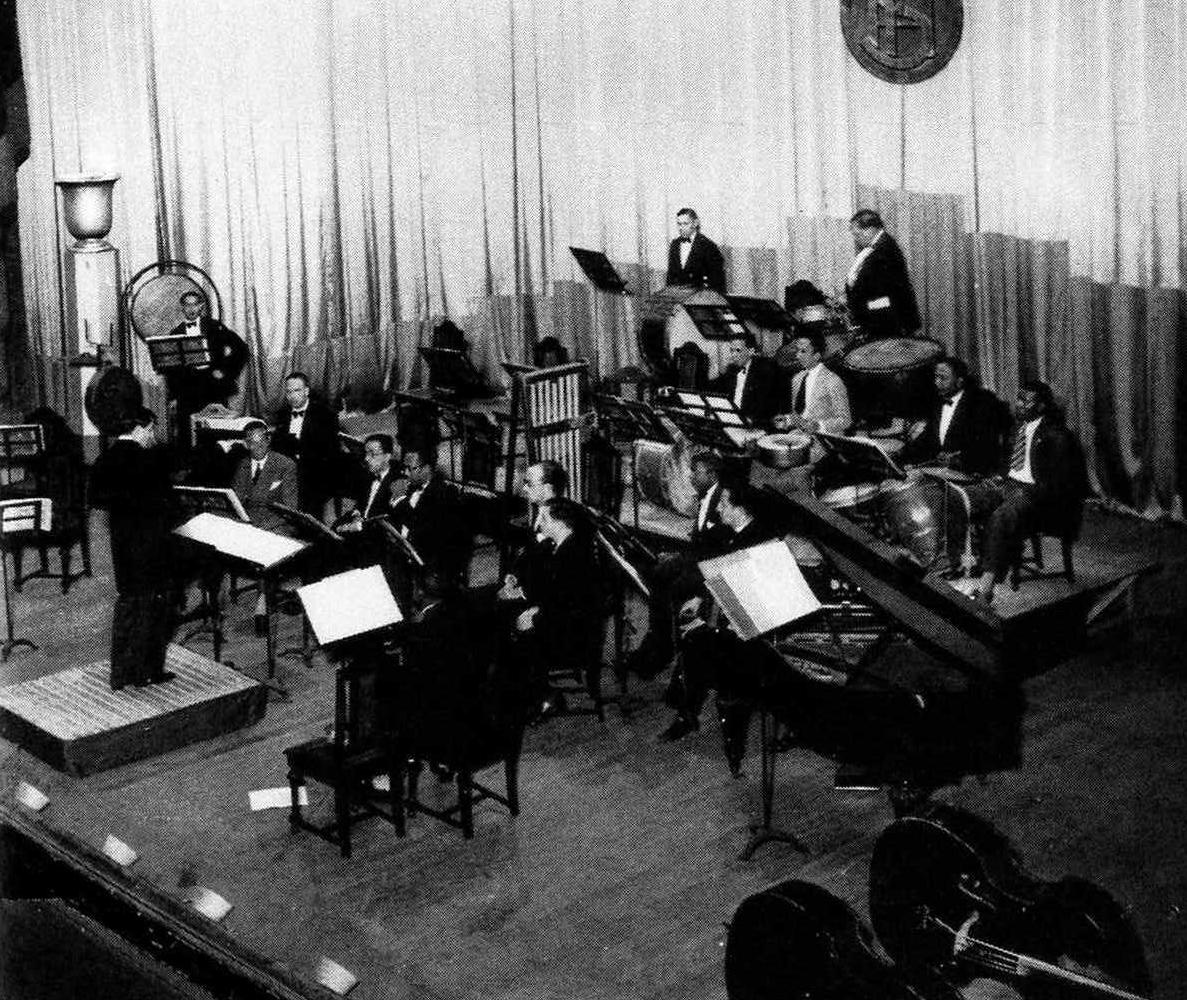
- Nicolas Slonimsky conducting Ionisation in Havana
- Composed: 1929–1931
- Duration: About 6 minutes
- Scoring: Percussion ensemble

Premiere
- Date: March 6, 1933
- Location: Carnegie Chapter Hall
- Conductor: Nicolas Slonimsky

Audio sample
- A 30-second sample from Ionisation: file; help

Ionisation (1929–1931) is a musical composition by Edgard Varèse written for thirteen percussionists. It was among the first concert hall compositions for percussion ensemble alone, although Alexander Tcherepnin had composed an entire movement for percussion alone in his Symphony No. 1 from 1927. In the journal Tempo, percussionist Brian Holder writes, "The work presented the important notion that unpitched percussion (with piano and other pitched instruments coming in at the end) could stand alone as a serious form of concert music – a relatively unexplored concept at the time."

The premiere was at Carnegie Chapter Hall, an annex to New York City's Carnegie Hall, on March 6, 1933, conducted by Nicolas Slonimsky, to whom the piece was later dedicated. One critic described the performance as "a sock in the jaw".

== Music ==
Ionisation features the expansion and variation of rhythmic cells, and the title refers to the ionization of molecules. As the composer later described, "I was not influenced by composers as much as by natural objects and physical phenomena". Varèse also acknowledged the influence of the Italian Futurist artists Luigi Russolo and Filippo Tommaso Marinetti in the composition of this work.

Both Chou Wen-chung and Jean-Charles François have analyzed the structure and timbre features of Ionisation in detail. András Wilheim has noted that only the last 17 measures of Ionisation include musical tones of the "traditional tonal system", where any five successive chords contain the 12 tones of the chromatic scale. Holder writes, "The reconceptualization of pitch was one of Varèse's great insights. He was able to reinvent the role of concert percussion in a radical and refreshing manner, primarily by establishing pitch relationships between instruments of individually indeterminate pitch... its performance is a reenactment of a great rite of passage for what was then a fresh and previously unrecognized musical ensemble."

Frank Zappa said that Ionisation inspired him to pursue a career in music, and that it was on the first long-playing album he purchased.

Jack Skurnick, director of EMS Recordings, produced early post-war recordings of Varèse; this piece appears on the first Varèse LP, EMS 401: Complete Works of Edgar Varèse, Volume 1. Ionisation had also been the first work by Varèse to be recorded in the 1930s, conducted by Nicolas Slonimsky and issued on 78 rpm Columbia 4095M. The players for the recording included, in addition to the composer himself on the sirens, Carlos Salzedo on Chinese blocks, Paul Creston on anvils, Wallingford Riegger on guiro, Henry Cowell on piano, and William Schuman on the lion's roar.

Sidney Finkelstein wrote in the EMS LP liner notes about the work:

[Ionisation] is built on a most sensitive handling and contrast of different kinds of percussive sounds. There are those indefinite in pitch, like the bass drum, snare drum, wood blocks, and cymbals; those of relatively definite musical pitch, such as the piano and chimes; those of continually moving pitch, like the sirens and 'lion's roar.' It is an example of 'spatial construction,' building up to a great complexity of interlocking 'planes' of rhythm and timbre, and then relaxing the tension with the slowing of rhythm, the entrance of the chimes, and the enlargement of the 'silences' between sounds. There are suggestions of the characteristic sounds of modern city life.

== Instrumentation ==
The piece is scored for 13 players:

1. large Chinese cymbal, very deep bass drum, cowbell
2. gong, high and low tam-tams, cowbell
3. bongos, tenor drum, medium and deep bass drums (laid flat)
4. field drum, tenor drum
5. high siren, lion's roar
6. low siren, whip, güiro
7. 3 Chinese blocks, claves, triangle
8. snare drum without snares, high and low maracas
9. tarole (a kind of piccolo snare drum), snare drum, suspended cymbal
10. clash cymbals, sleigh bells, chimes
11. güiro, castanets, glockenspiel a clavier (with resonators)
12. tambourine, 2 anvils, very deep tam-tam
13. whip, sleigh bells, triangle, piano

== See also ==
- Ballet Mécanique, another early percussion ensemble piece often cited as the first
