= Randy Napoleon =

American jazz guitarist, composer, and arranger

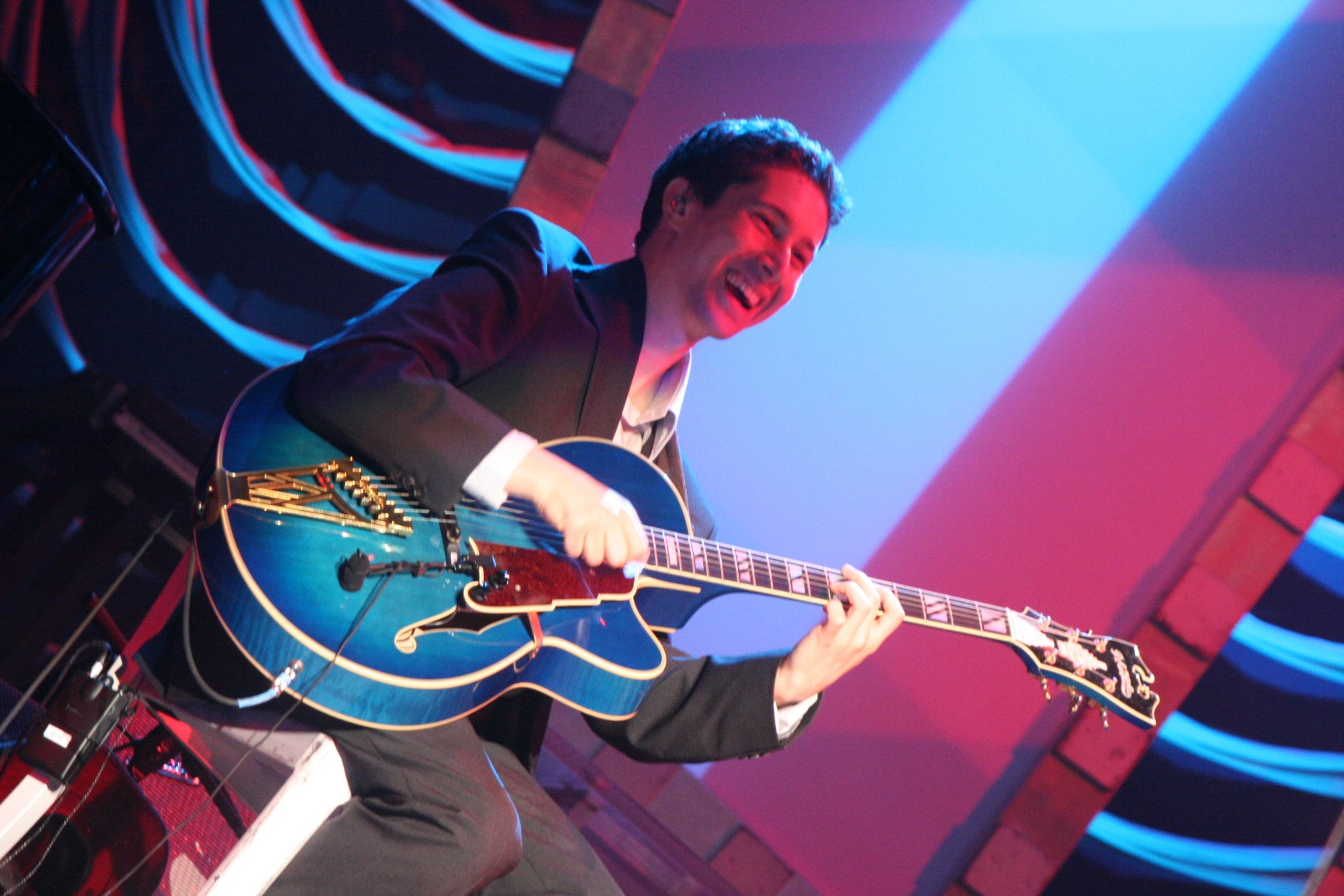
- Randy Napoleon

Background information
- Born: Brooklyn, New York, U.S.
- Genres: Jazz
- Occupation: Musician
- Instrument: guitar
- Labels: Azica, Gut String, Harbinger, Detroit Music Factory
- Website: randynapoleon.com

Randy Napoleon is an American jazz guitarist, composer, and arranger who tours nationally and internationally. He has also toured with the Freddy Cole Quartet, Benny Green, the Clayton-Hamilton Jazz Orchestra led by John Clayton, Jeff Clayton, and Jeff Hamilton, Rene Marie, and with Michael Bublé.

He is an expert on the Cole school, the music of Freddy Cole and Nat King Cole.

He is an associate professor and associate director of jazz studies in the College of Music at Michigan State University and has done master classes at universities and music schools throughout the United States and Canada. During a 2023 tour of Japan, he taught at several colleges throughout the country. During summers, he is on the faculty of the Brevard Music Center's Jazz Institute.He is also the artistic director of the East Lansing Jazz Festival.

== Early life ==
Napoleon was born in Brooklyn, New York. He is the son of Greg Napoleon, a software engineer, and Davi Napoleon, a theater historian and arts journalist, and the grandson of Jack Skurnick, a musicologist and founder of EMS Recordings, and Fay Kleinman, a painter.

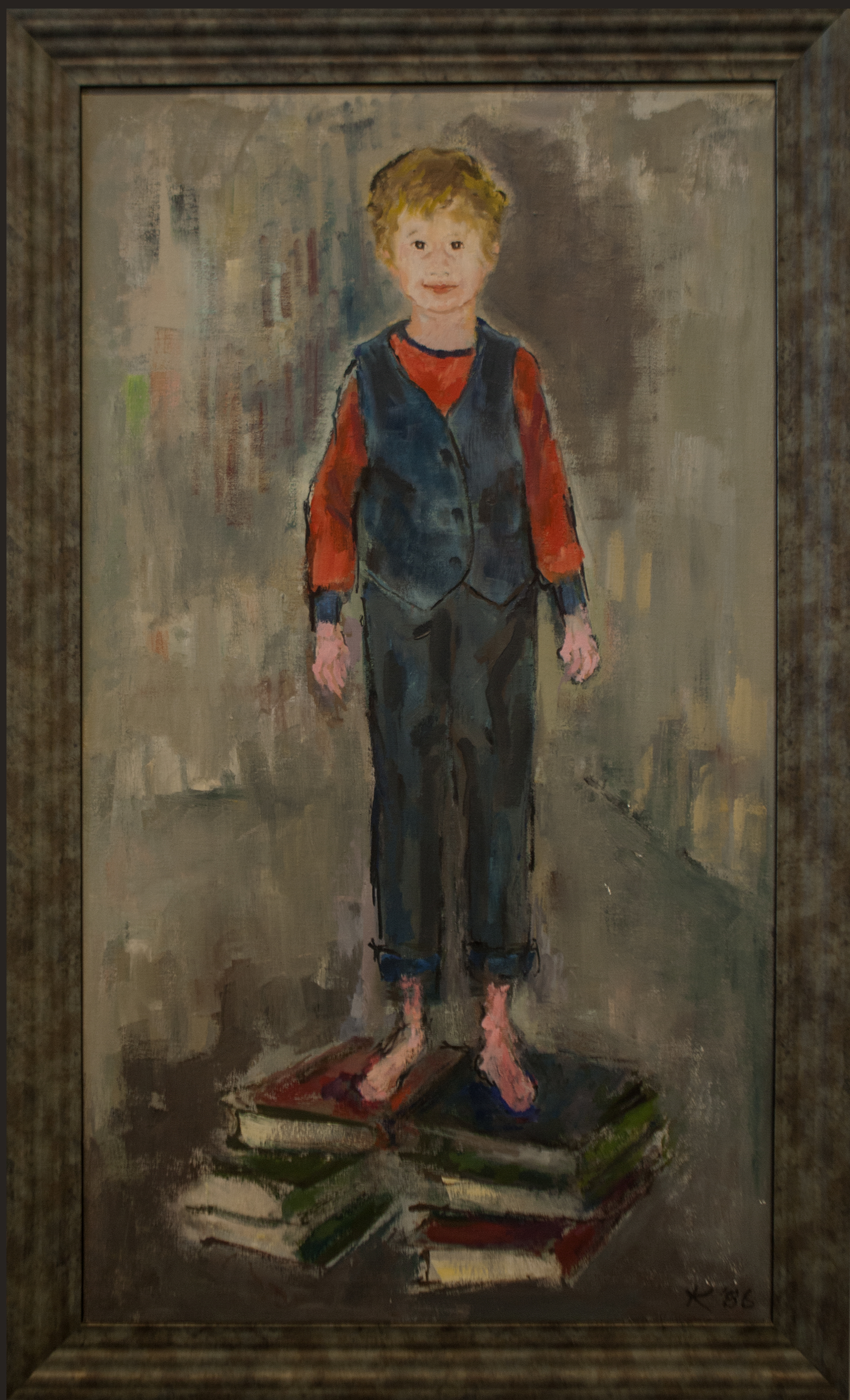

He has one younger brother, Brian Napoleon. His family moved to Ann Arbor, Michigan, when he was two years old. He studied violin in the Ann Arbor schools before discovering the guitar.

One of Napoleon's formative experiences was in a big band at Ann Arbor Pioneer High School, led by trumpeter Louis Smith. Napoleon also played at the jazz clubs in Ann Arbor and learned from jam sessions at the Bird of Paradise Club. Early opportunities at the Del Rio, a local bar, and at events sponsored by WEMU, a local NPR jazz radio station, helped start his career. When he was in high school, the Ann Arbor News covered his developing talent. Napoleon studied at the University of Michigan School of Music.

== Later life and career ==
Napoleon has led an organ trio which has toured the United States and United Kingdom and which did a concert for BBC radio. The trio appears on Enjoy the Moment and Randy Napoleon: Between Friends, both featuring Jared Gold (organist) and drummer Quincy Davis. Between Friends, a 2006 release from Azica Records, features the trio on half the tracks and a quartet on the other, with Davis, bassist David Wong, and Benny Green on piano. The Randy Napoleon three-horn sextet appears on his 2012 album The Jukebox Crowd. A trio with Rodney Whitaker on bass and Gregory Hutchinson on drums appears on his album for the Detroit Music Factory, Soon.

Napoleon has performed and arranged on all of Freddy Cole's albums since 2009. He has appeared on TV with Cole, on a 2007 PBS special, and on the 2009 Jerry Lewis Muscular Dystrophy Telethon. Napoleon has appeared on Grammy-nominated albums, including Michael Buble: Caught in the Act, Freddy Cole Sings Mr. B, and Freddy Cole: My Mood is You. He arranged music for the two Cole albums.

Napoleon has also toured with Benny Green (2000–2001), Clayton-Hamilton Jazz Orchestra (2003–2004), and Michael Bublé (2004–2007). He has appeared on TV in Japan with CHJO and throughout Europe, Asia and America with Bublé. His U.S. TV appearances with Bublé include David Letterman, Jay Leno, The View, The Today Show, The Ellen DeGeneres Show, Regis and Kelly, Dancing with the Stars, the Radio Music Awards, Entertainment Tonight, and a PBS special, Caught in the Act.

Napoleon has performed with Monty Alexander, Peter and Will Anderson, Bill Charlap, Michael Dease, Rene Marie, and Rodney Whitaker. He has appeared with cabaret performers Eric Comstock and Barbara Fasano.

Napoleon has performed at Lincoln Center, Hollywood Bowl, The Kennedy Center, Radio City Music Hall, Royal Albert Hall in London, the Sydney Opera House in Australia, and the Detroit Jazz Festival.

Napoleon moved to New York City after graduating from the University of Michigan in 1999. He returned to Michigan to teach at the University of Michigan School of Music, Theater and Dance from 2013 to 2014. In the fall of 2014, he accepted an appointment to Michigan State University's College of Music where he is currently a tenured associate professor of jazz and serves as associate director of Jazz Studies. There, he performs with the MSU Professors of jazz, teaches jazz guitar, and leads a student octet. He has taught master classes and clinics at many colleges including Bucknell University, Temple University, Humber College, and Oakland University.

He married Alison Rogers Napoleon in 2010. They have two children, Jack Lawrence (2013) and Juliet Claire (2017). Jack is named for Jack Skurnick, Napoleon's maternal grandfather.

== Selected discography ==
=== As leader ===
- Enjoy the Moment co-leader with Jared Gold (PKO, 2002)
- Between Friends (Azica, 2006)
- Bitter/Sweet co-leader with Eric Comstock (Harbindger, 2010)
- The Jukebox Crowd (Gut String, 2011)
- Soon (Detroit Music Factory, 2016)
- Common Tones (Detroit Music Factory, 2019)
- Rust Belt Roots: Randy Napoleon Plays Wes Montgomery, Grant Green & Kenny Burrell (OA2 Records, 2021)
- Puppets: The Music of Gregg Hill (OA2 Records, 2022)
- The Door is Open: The Music of Gregg Hill (OA2 Records, 2024)
- Waking Dream: The Music of Gregg Hill and Randy Napoleon (OA2 Records, 2025)

=== As sideman ===
With Freddy Cole, guitarist and arranger

- Era Jazzu (Era Jazzu [Poland], 2007)
- The Dreamer in Me: Live at Dizzy's Club Coca-Cola (HighNote, 2009)
- Freddy Cole Sings Mr. B (HighNote, 2010)
- Talk to Me (HighNote, 2011)
- This and That (HighNote, 2013)
- Singing the Blues (HighNote, 2014)
- He Was The King (HighNote, 2016)
- A Freddy Cole Christmas (HighNote, 2018)
- My Mood Is You (HighNote, 2018)

With others

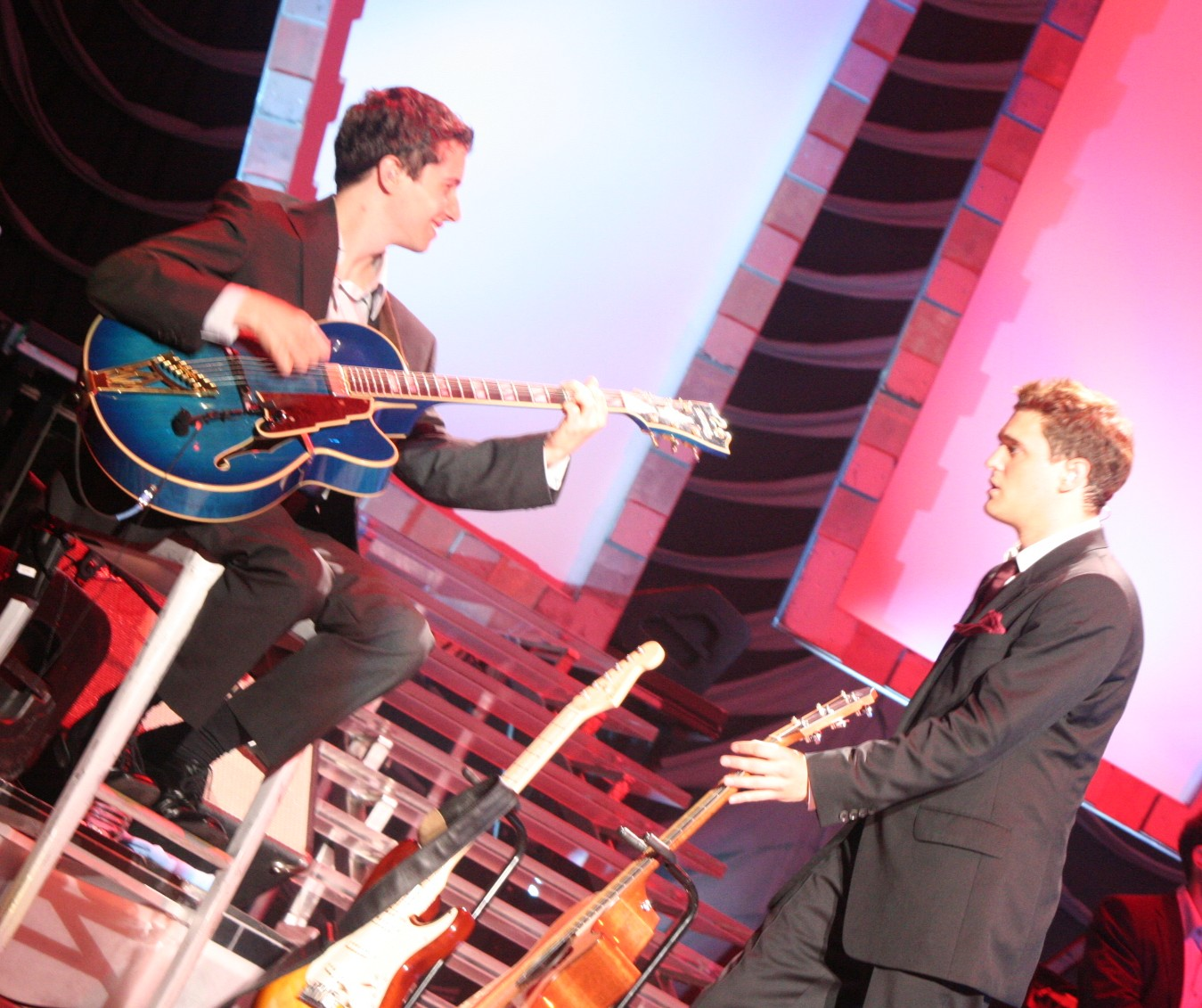
Randy Napoleon with Michael Bublé

- Michael Buble, Caught in the Act (Reprise, 2005)
- Michael Buble, With Love (Reprise, 2006)
- Michael Buble, Let It Snow! (Reprise, 2007)
- Michael Buble, A Taste of Bublé (Reprise, 2008)
- Etienne Charles, Creole Christmas (Culture Shock Music, 2015)
- The Clayton–Hamilton Jazz Orchestra, Live at MCG (MCG, 2005)
- Michael Dease, All These Hands (Posi-Tone, 2016)
- Michael Dease, Give it All You Got (Posi-Tone, 2021)
- Hilary Gardner, The Great City (Anzic, 2014)
- Jared Gold, Solids & Stripes (Posi-Tone, 2008)
- Melissa Morgan, Until I Met You (Telarc, 2009)
- Jocelyn Gould, Sonic Boquet (Revolution Recording, 2023)
- Anthony Stanco, Stanco's Time (OA2 Records, 2024)
- Anthony Stanco In the Groove: Live at the Alluvion (0A2 Records, 2025)
- Rodney Whitaker, Outrospection: The Music of Gregg Hill (Origin, 2021)
- Libby York, Dreamland (Origin, 2023)
