= Filmus =

Filmus is a surname. Notable people with the surname include:

- Daniel Filmus (born 1955), Argentine politician and academic
- Tully Filmus (1903–1998), American realist painter
