= Decidedly Jazz Danceworks =

Decidedly Jazz Danceworks (DJD) is a Canadian jazz dance company and dance school based in Calgary, Alberta. The company was founded in 1984 and offers regular performances and classes in the Decidedly Jazz Danceworks Centre, located in Calgary’s Kahanoff Centre, a 26 million-dollar facility developed specifically for the company and school. The company has performed in various locations in Canada, as well as the U.S. and internationally. Performance credits include the Toronto Fall for Dance North festival, and Jacob's Pillow in Becket, Massachusetts in the U.S. In 2022, the three founders of DJD, Vicki Adams Willis, Michele Moss, and Hannah Stilwell, were inducted into the Canadian Dance Hall of Fame in Toronto, Canada. This award honored their work in establishing the company and their creative contributions to the company since then. In addition, founder and former director Vicki Adams Willis has won both the Lieutenant Governor of Alberta Arts Award (2021) as well as the University of Calgary's Distinguished Alumni Award for Lifetime Achievement (2020). Current director Kimberley Cooper has also been honored with Dance Victoria's Crystal Dance Prize in 2014 for her dance research in Brazil, as well as the 2002 Emerging Artist of the Year Award from Alberta Dance Alliance.

== Beginnings ==
In 1984, University of Calgary jazz dance department head, Vicki Adams Willis, along with two of her graduating students, Michèle Moss and Hannah Stilwell, started Decidedly Jazz Danceworks. Their mission was to bring attention to the African American roots of jazz dance and create a concert jazz dance company. The three began their creative work in a one-room upstairs dance studio in Calgary, choreographing, rehearsing, and presenting new jazz dance pieces to live music. They received a grant to hire four dancers for two months: Stilwell, Moss, Jill Currie, and Sean Cheesman, and the show's success caused them to extend its run. Willis encouraged her younger co-founders to study dance in Africa and the Caribbean, to develop embodied knowledge of the roots of jazz dance. The two took their first research trip to Dakar in Senegal in 1986 to study dance.

By 1987, Decidedly Jazz Danceworks had ten dancers, all of them full-time. That was also the year that they created a dance school. They offered classes in jazz dance and related forms, while continuing to perform. Over time, they began to offer additional classes in a variety of dance styles. Their school developed both a recreational dance program and a professional training program. Founding Artistic Director Willis has won several honors and awards over the last decade, including the 2020 Distinguished Alumni Award for Lifetime Achievement from University of Calgary; 2021 Lieutenant Governor of Alberta Arts Awards, 2022 induction into Canada's Dance Collection Danse Hall of Fame, and a 2022 Queen Elizabeth 11 Platinum Jubilee Medal. In addition to travelling throughout Canada, the company performed at the Havana International Jazz Festival in 2005.

== Development ==
Because Willis' company members travelled to study the roots of jazz in a variety of cultures, they returned to Calgary with dance knowledge to share with others. Dance study in African and African-diasporic communities still influences the company and school today. Individuals within the company have studied and taught many styles including swing, Afro-Brazilian, rhythm tap, salsa, South Indian bharata natyam, flamenco, and Afro-Cuban. All of these have contributed to the movement possibilities within the company's choreography.

Throughout the 1990s, Willis, as the primary choreographer for the company, transitioned away from the more balletic influences common to concert jazz dance companies in the late 20th century. Instead, she incorporated the African-based forms that the dancers learned. She also had the dancers generate movement through improvisation, instead of crafting every step of the choreography herself. This revealed the dancers' strengths, which Willis integrated into the artistic work.

DJD received its first grants from the Canada Council for the Arts in 1999, 15 years after its founding. The company was originally prohibited from applying for Council funding, since the Council would fund only ballet and modern dance until it changed its policy in 1993. The grants received were from the Touring Grants Program and the Creation/Production in Dance: Multi-Year and Biennial Grants Program.

Willis has produced over 35 original works for the company since its inception. She continued her leadership of the company until 2013, when she transitioned to the role of Founder in Residence, and appointed dancer/choreographer Kimberly Cooper as Artistic Director of the company.

== Further developments ==
Cooper worked with DJD beginning in 1989 as a dancer, then became Artistic Associate/Resident Choreographer in 2001, and finally became Artistic Director in 2013. In addition to choreographing for Decidedly Jazz Danceworks, Cooper has created choreography for dancers at Salve Regina University in Newport, RI, USA, and for a dance film collaboration in 2023 with Noel Bégin. Her film, Three Horsewomen, was shown at the 2024 Dance on Camera Festival at Lincoln Center, New York City.

Under Cooper's direction, Decidedly Jazz Danceworks creates two to three original works each year, at least one of which has live music. Their philosophy is that jazz music is the foundation of jazz dance, and their collaborations have included work with musicians Rubim de Toledo, Tommy Banks, Mark Murphy, PJ Perry, Jackie Richardson, and others.

One of the biggest company developments during Cooper's tenure was the opening of the new DJD Dance Centre in the Kahanoff Building in Calgary in 2016. This 26 million-dollar centre was created in a collaboration between DJD and the Kahanoff Foundation. The 40,000 square foot space holds a 230-seat theatre as well as seven dance studios, and serves as a hub for the Calgary dance community. DJD runs a dance school at this location, offering 50 classes each week in a variety of genres and styles, including dance for people with Parkinson's disease.

Kathi Sundstrom is the Executive Director of Decidedly Jazz Danceworks, and was involved in the development of the Kahanoff Centre. She helped gather funding from a number of sources including the Kahanoff Foundation, the Calgary Foundation, three levels of government (local, provincial, federal) as well as corporate and private donors. In recognition of her work with DJD, Sundstrom won the 2016 Calgary Award for Community Achievement in the Arts.

Decidedly Jazz Danceworks was featured in the 2020 award-winning film Uprooted: The Journey of Jazz Dance. This film looks at the history and roots of jazz dance through the perspectives of many well-known dancers and choreographers, including Chita Rivera, Susan Stroman, and Camille Brown. Kimberley Cooper served as a panelist for a discussion of the film at the Toronto Black Film Festival in 2021.

== Choreography ==
In 2016, when Decidedly Jazz Danceworks moved into its new quarters in the Kahanoff Building, they marked the occasion with performances of an original work by director Kimberley Cooper called New Universe. After introductions from Alberta's Lieutenant-Governor Lois Mitchell and Calgary's mayor, Naheed Nenshi, the company presented a two-hour dance work inspired by insects. The piece was divided into five distinct sections: "Bees to Honey," The Ants Go Marching," "Pollen," "Molting," and "New Universe." The show contained a mix of solos, duets, and group dances. The idea for the dance was sparked by a praying mantis that Cooper encountered in Brazil, as well as the French documentary film Microcosmos (1996) about invertebrates and insects. The human representations of bugs, bees, and other insects was set to a musical score for jazz quintet, performed live behind the dancers, who were dressed in "winged costumes and ... form-fitting exoskeleton designs." The five-part performance expressed a symbolic narrative referencing primordial beginnings on earth, progressing through territoriality, war, and love.

In 2022, Cooper directed and choreographed for Family of Jazz, performed both in Canada and in the US. The evening was designed to showcase different elements of jazz and related styles, such as tap, and included a variety of choreography including Melanie George's "Groove Theory" and Brandi Coleman's "Out from Under," as well as dances by Kimberley Cooper. Calgary reviewer Stephan Bonfield noted that the individual works included a tap quartet and a seven-dancer ensemble piece emphasizing rhythms created with the body and voice. A slightly different version of Family of Jazz was presented at Jacob's Pillow, also in 2022. Jacob's Pillow is an international dance venue located in Becket, Massachusetts. Reviewer Katherine Abbott of The Berkshire Eagle stated that the company performed to a live band led by bass player Rubim de Toledo, with singer Karimah on vocals. Abbott noted the high energy generated by the musicians and dancers onstage, referencing "fast footwork in sync and an inflection of salsa and disco." The performance emphasized many elements and moods of jazz dance, reflecting influences from Africa, the Caribbean, Cuba, and Canada.

Decidedly Jazz Danceworks continues to generate new performances and reviews.
