= Emanuel Levenson =

American musician (1916–1998)

Emanuel Levenson (August 2, 1916 – June 9, 1998) was an American classical musician most active from the early 1950s through the mid-1980s. Best known at the time as an opera director, he also taught piano and voice, performed as a concert pianist, and founded several arts organizations which survive to this day.

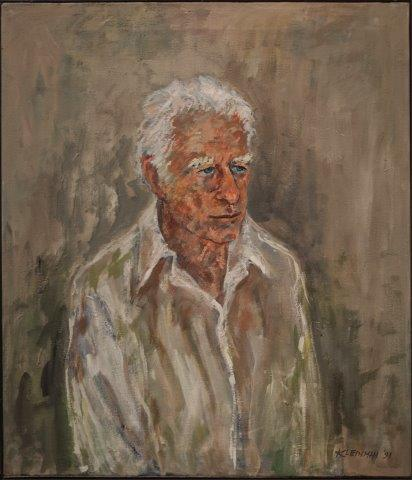
Emanuel (1991) by Fay Kleinman

A graduate of Columbia University who had studied piano under Joseph Adler, Levenson co-founded the Pennybridge Opera Company in Brooklyn, New York and Berkshire Pro Musica in Pittsfield, Massachusetts. He served as the music director of several opera companies, as director of Young Audiences, an organization that brought opera performers into schools, and he taught an opera workshop and directed numerous operas at The New School. Independently, he also taught piano as well as vocal technique. From 1960 to 1985 he commuted to New York City from Becket, Massachusetts.

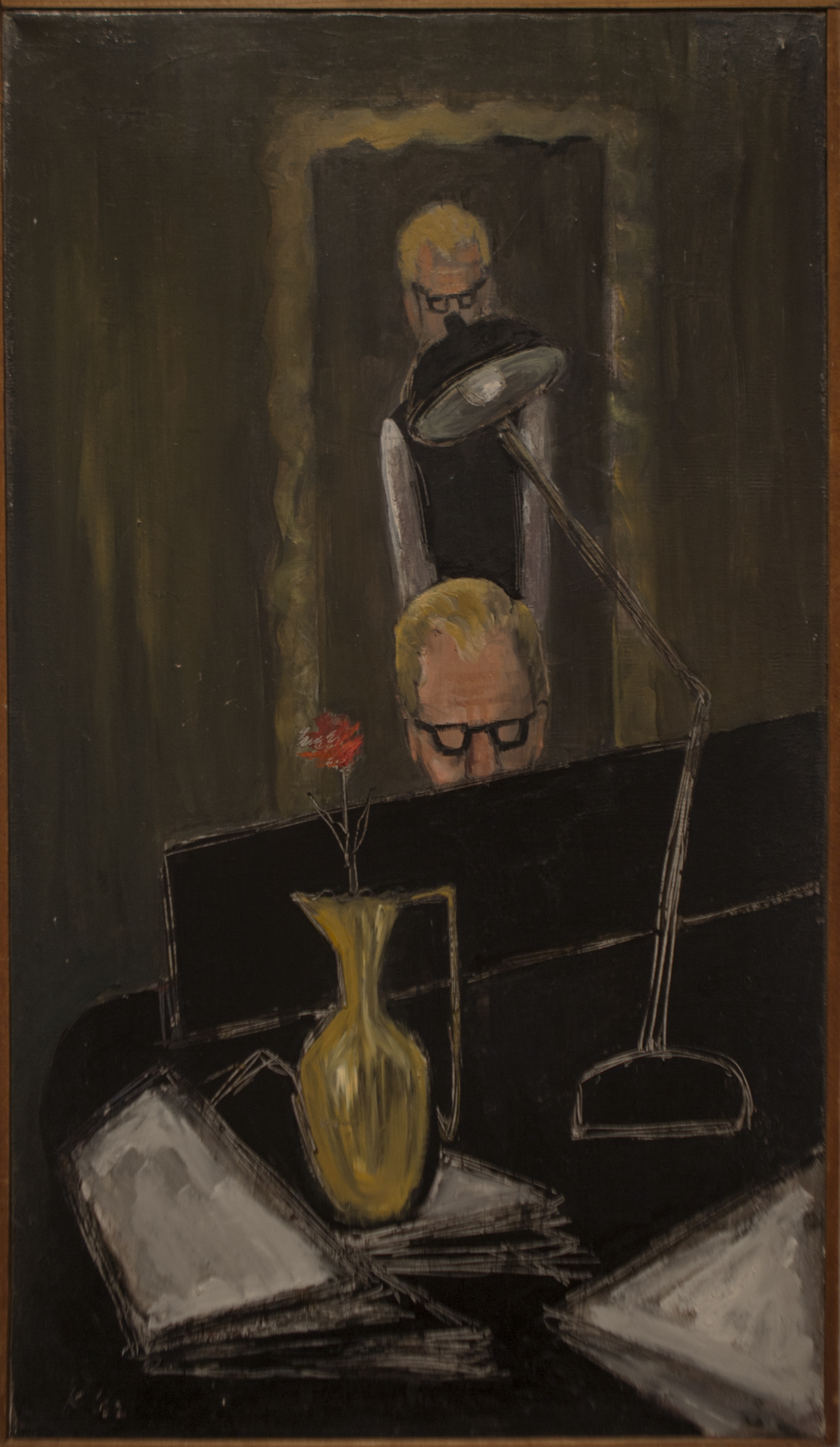
At the Piano (undated) by Fay Kleinman

As a pianist, Levenson made one recording, which was only released as a long-playing record album. Survey of the Art Song (EMS 501), recorded circa 1950 on EMS Recordings, Jack Skurnick's record label, included recordings of nine art song by Edvard Grieg and eight by Charles Griffes, performed by Levenson in accompaniment with tenor Norman Myrvik.

Levenson first married Elizabeth Myers during World War II, and had one son, Michael R. Levenson. Then he married Theodora ("Teddy") and had two children, who took their step-father's name, Jeffrum Neiblum and Eve Neiblum. Several years following Skurnick's death in 1952, Levenson married his widow, painter Fay Kleinman. Together, Levenson and Kleinman founded the Becket Arts Center in Becket in 1971. In the mid-1980s, Levenson and Kleinman moved to Ypsilanti, Michigan, where he lived until his death in 1998, at the age of 81, and where she resided until her death on February 21, 2012.
