= Enjoy the Moment =

Studio album by Randy Napoleon and Jared Gold
- Released: 2002
- Genre: Bebop, Jazz

Enjoy the Moment is a 2002 album, a collaboration of guitarist Randy Napoleon and organist Jared Gold, featuring Quincy Davis on drums.

"Enjoy the Moment" is also the name of the title song, written by Napoleon. Speaking about the title song, Napoleon noted, “The melody came to me walking down Broadway with some friends. It's a song about appreciating friendship”.

Later collaborations between the artists include Napoleon's 2006 album, Randy Napoleon: Between Friends, which also features Davis and Gold and includes bass guitarist David Wong and pianist Benny Green. Gold's 2008 album, Solids & Stripes, features Napoleon on guitar.

== Tracks ==
1. The Nest (Jared Gold)
2. Enjoy the Moment (Randy Napoleon)
3. Never Let Me Go (Jay Livingston & Ray Evans)
4. This End Up (Jared Gold)
5. To Have, To Lose (Randy Napoleon)
6. I Wish I Knew (Harry Warren & Mack Gordon)
7. Taking a Chance on Love (Vernon Duke, Ted Fetter, & John Latouche)
8. In My Life
