= Lower Historic District =

Historic district in Massachusetts, United States

- U.S. National Register of Historic Places
- U.S. Historic district
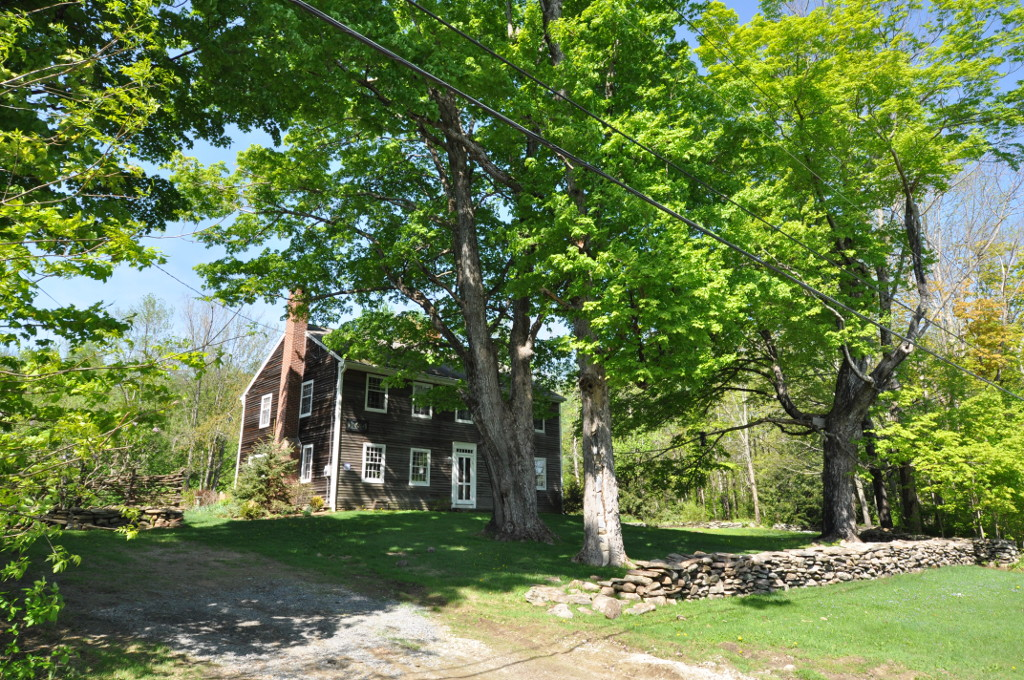
- Wm. Milliken House, 1796 Washington Mtn. Rd.

- Location within Massachusetts Location within the United States
- Location: Washington Mtn. Rd., Washington, Massachusetts
- Coordinates: 42°20′24″N 73°7′4″W
- Area: 130 acres (53 ha)
- Architectural style: Colonial, Federal
- MPS: Washington MRA
- NRHP reference No.: 86002141
- Added to NRHP: September 12, 1986

Lower Historic District is a historic district on Washington Mountain Road in Washington, Massachusetts. The district encompasses four homesteads built between 1765 and 1803, including the town's oldest house. The houses are clustered along a stretch of Washington Mountain Road near the town line with Becket, and represent one of its first places of settlement. The district was listed on the National Register of Historic Places in 1986.

== Description and history ==
Land grants in the area that is now the town of Washington were first made in 1763. One of the first ten grants was made to William Milliken, who built the house at 1796 Washington Mountain Road not long afterward. Between then and the early 19th century, Milliken was joined by three other settlers in the immediate area, which is set on a terrace on the southeastern slope of Washington Mountain (elevation 1,600 feet (490 m)). This dispersed rural development was typical of the region in the period, but has in many instances been lost due to infill development. In this area, the soil was never very good for agriculture, and the properties changed hands numerous times. The area also lacked resources for industrial development, and was bypassed by the railroads, all of which were factors that effectively precluded later development.

The district extends along Washington Mountain Road, north from the town line with Becket. Its principal surviving built resources are four houses, of which the Milliken house is the only one that predates American independence. The other three were built in the late 18th or early 19th century, and are examples of vernacular Federal period architecture. All are of wood-frame construction, with clapboarded exteriors; one is 1 1/2 stories in height, while the other three are 2 1/2 stories. There is also a 19th-century barn associated with one of the houses.

== See also ==
- Upper Historic District (Washington, Massachusetts), which encompasses the old town center
- National Register of Historic Places listings in Berkshire County, Massachusetts
