= Jared Gold (organist) =

American jazz organist

L-R: Jared Gold, Randy Napoleon, Quincy Davis

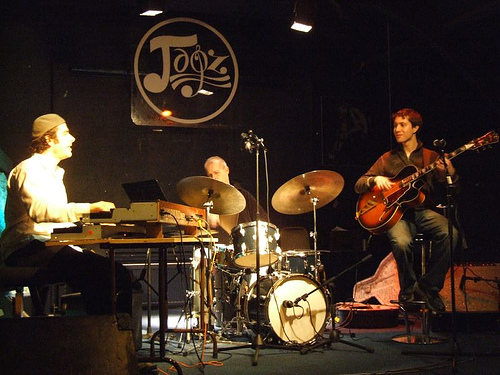
In London with Randy Napoleon Trio

Jared Gold is an American jazz organist who plays the Hammond B-3 organ.

He attended William Paterson University in Wayne, New Jersey. In 1988 he won the Governor's Award for Jazz Performance in New Jersey. He has worked with Ralph Bowen, Benny Golson, Bill Goodwin, Bob Mintzer, Ralph Peterson Jr., Benny Powell, John Swana, and John Webber. Gold has been influenced by Larry Young, Jack McDuff, and Don Patterson.

In 2004, guitarist Dave Stryker included Gold in his trio with drummer Tony Reedus. Gold appeared at Chez Hanny in 2005 with the Dan Pratt Organ Quartet, and in 2007 he toured the UK with the Randy Napoleon Trio. He recorded his first solo album, Solids & Stripes (Posi-Tone, 2008) with Randy Napoleon on guitar, Seamus Blake on tenor saxophone, and Mark Ferber on drums. Gold appears on two albums with Napoleon and drummer Quincy Davis. These are Enjoy the Moment and Randy Napoleon: Between Friends. The first is a collaboration between Gold and Napoleon and prominently features two of Gold's compositions.

== Discography ==
- Solids & Stripes (Posi-Tone, 2008) with Randy Napoleon
- Supersonic (Posi-Tone, 2009) with Ed Cherry
- Out of Line (Posi-Tone, 2010) with Dave Stryker
- All Wrapped Up (Posi-Tone, 2011)
- Golden Child (Posi-Tone, 2012) with Ed Cherry
- Intuition (Posi-Tone, 2013) with Dave Stryker
- JG3+3 (Posi-Tone, 2014) with Dave Stryker
- Metropolitan Rhythm (Posi-Tone, 2015) with Dave Stryker
- Reemergence (Strikezone, 2018) with Dave Stryker

=== With Oliver Lake ===
- Makin' It (Passin' Thru, 2008)
- Plan (Passin' Thru, 2010)
- What I Heard (Passin' Thru, 2014)

=== With Randy Napoleon ===
- Enjoy the Moment (PKO, 2002)
- Between Friends (Azica, 2006)

=== With Dan Pratt Organ Quartet ===
- Springloaded (Sunny Sky, 2004)
- Toe The Line (Posi-Tone, 2010)

=== With Avi Rothbard ===
- Going Somewhere (MidLantic, 2002)

=== With Dave Stryker ===
- The Chaser (Mel Bay, 2006)
- One for Reedus (SteepleChase, 2010)
- Keystone (SteepleChase, 2010)
- Blue Strike (SteepleChase, 2011)
- Blue to the Bone IV (SteepleChase, 2012)
- Eight Track (Strikezone, 2014)
- Messin' with Mister T (Strikezone, 2015)
- Eight Track II (Strikezone, 2016)
- Strykin' Ahead (Strikezone, 2017)
- Eight Track III (Strikezone, 2019)
- Eight Track Christmas (Strikezone, 2019)
- Prime (Strikezone, 2023)
