= Fay Kleinman =

American painter

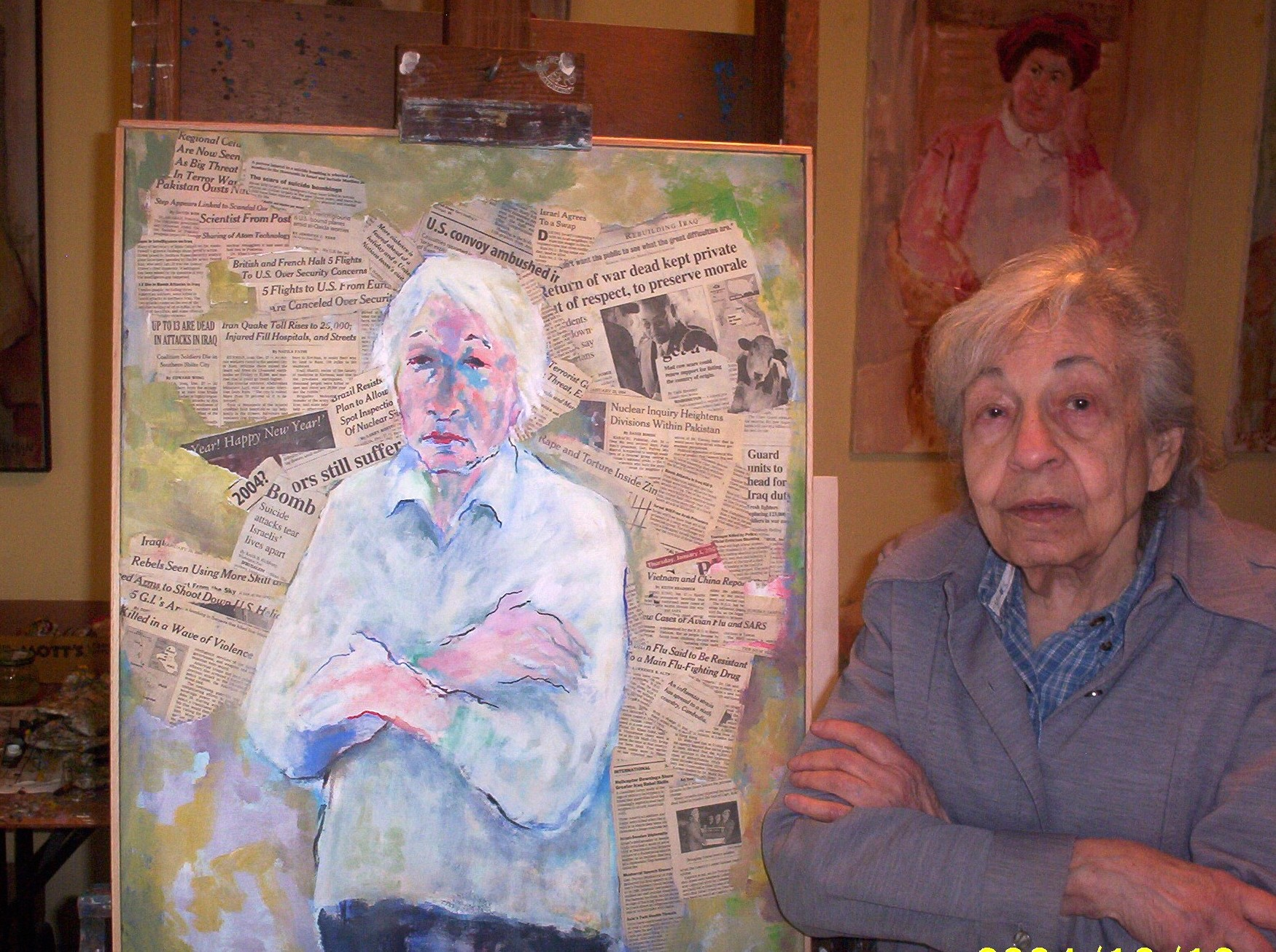
- Kleinman alongside her mixed-mediawork, The World Around Me. (Oil and paper on canvas, from the collection of the MSU Broad Art Museum, East Lansing MI)
- Born: November 29, 1912; New York City, U.S.
- Died: February 21, 2012 (aged 99); Ypsilanti, Michigan, U.S.
- Education: American Artists School
- Known for: Painting
- Notable work: Zayde series, The World Around Me
- Spouse(s): Jack Skurnick, Emanuel Levenson

Fay Kleinman (November 29, 1912 – February 21, 2012) was an American painter. She was also known by her married names, Fay Skurnick, and then Fay Levenson. The medium of most of the works Kleinman created is oil on canvas, but she also produced some mixed-media work and watercolors. She exhibited in museums in New York and Massachusetts and in galleries throughout the country. She was the co-founder of the Becket Arts Center in Becket, Massachusetts with Tully Filmus and Emanuel Levenson.

== Biography ==
Kleinman studied at the American Artists School: murals with Anton Refregier, painting with Jean Liberte, and sculpture with Milton Hebald. She also took classes through the WPA, City College of New York, and the National Academy of Design.

Kleinman continued to paint into her nineties. She painted portraits of her daughter and both her grandsons. One portrait of her grandson, Randy Napoleon at ten years old was purchased in 2005 by the Ypsilanti District Library in Ypsilanti, Michigan, where it hangs in front of the children's collection. Another painting of Randy and paintings of Brian Napoleon were included in a 2006 show at the Ann Arbor District Library, Ordinary People, in which Kleinman showed the extraordinary qualities of "ordinary" individuals.

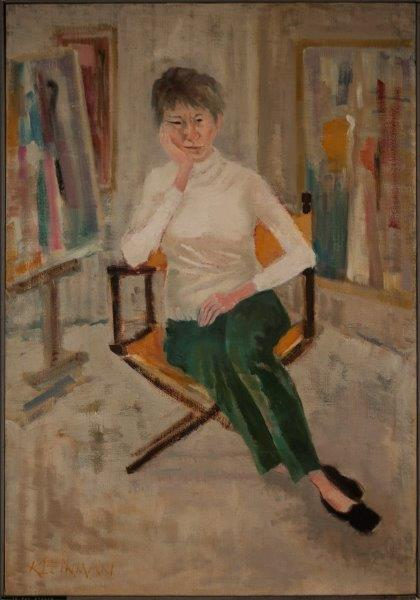

In addition to portraits, she created abstractions, still lifes, and landscapes. She was best known for her "Zayde" series, paintings created from sketches her father did for her daughter based on stories her daughter, then three, made up for him. They were first exhibited in 1971 at the Becket Arts Center, Massachusetts. They were compared to the works of Paul Klee, include fanciful figures and places.

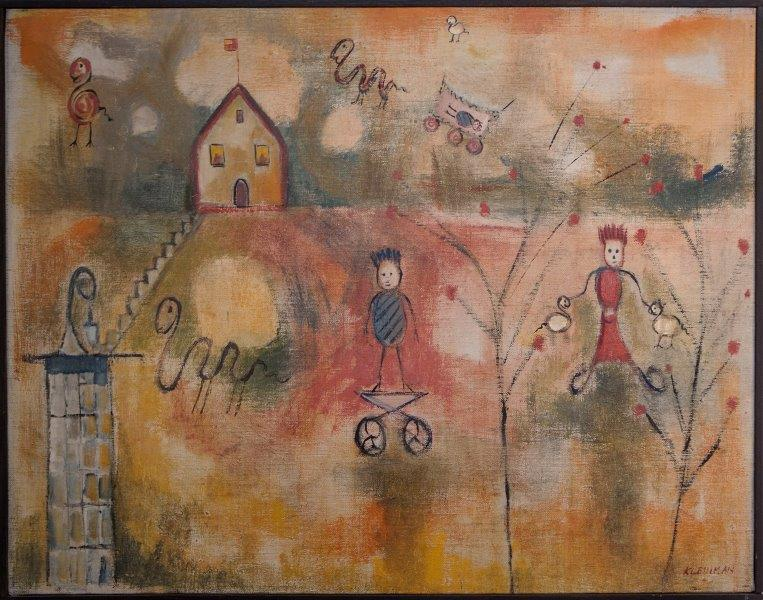

Kleinman was also known for her paintings of cats. She painted her own cats and those of friends and did humorous sketches of cats in assorted situations. Often in her work, cats took center stage, looming larger than the people in her paintings.

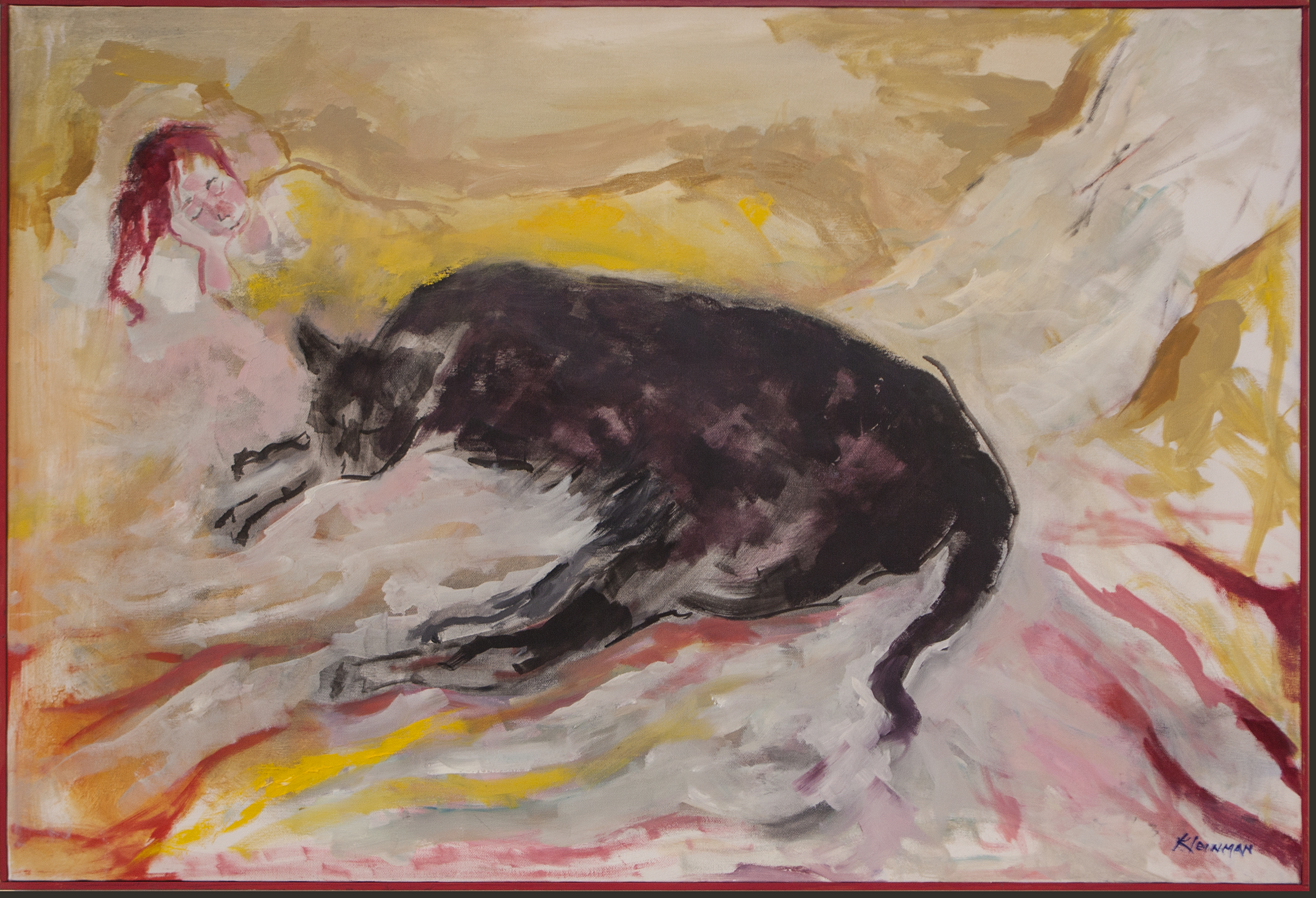

She was also recognized for her mixed-media work, which sometimes utilized wallpaper remnants or tissue paper. In one painting, two people are having coffee. Only one person is in the painting; the other is reflected in the coffee pot.

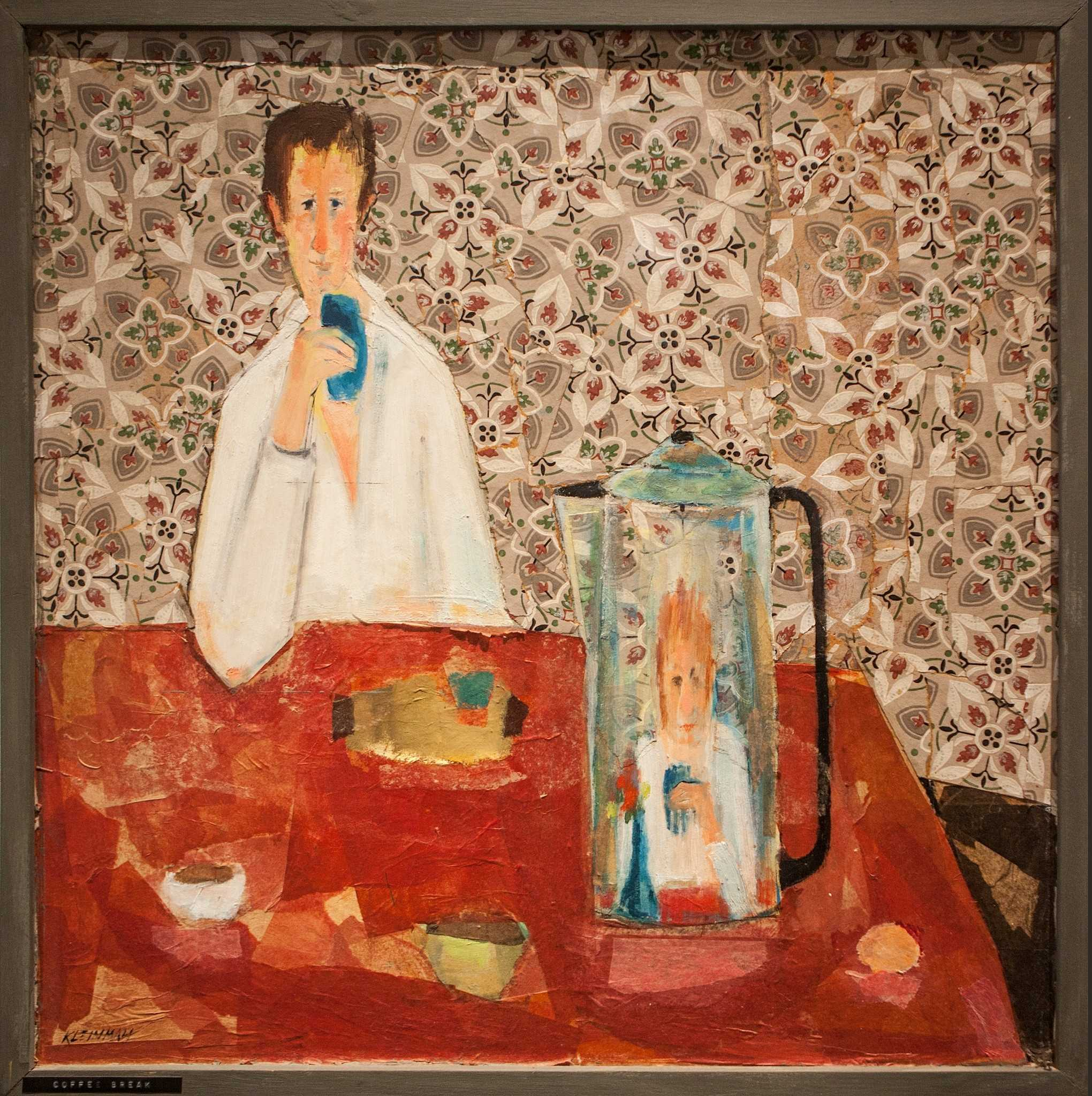

After a career that included sales through galleries in New York and various New England cities, Kleinman sold many paintings in her senior years. In 2007 the University of Michigan purchased a mixed media self-portrait of a woman reading a newspaper. It is permanently displayed in the university's new East Ann Arbor Health Center.

After her death, in August 2012, some of her paintings were displayed at Gallery 55+ in Ann Arbor and she was given a retrospective by the University of Michigan School of Art & Design. More than 300 paintings were displayed in the latter, which chronicled Kleinman's career from the early 1930s through 2010, when she did her last full painting. Local news site singled out her painting, The World Around Me, as the key work, saying it was painted with "a directness that’s a testimony to the aesthetic and social integrity that modernism sought to reflect."

In 2021, her grandson Randy Napoleon released an album, Rust Belt Roots, and used a photograph of her painting, Ypsilanti Blues, as cover art. In 2022, he released Puppets, with her painting Masks as cover art. In 2024, he released The Door is Open, with her painting I'm a Little Wolverine as cover art.

Kleinman survived two husbands, Jack Skurnick, who died in 1952 and was the father of Davida, also known as Davi Napoleon. Skurnick was a record producer and violinist. She later married Emanuel Levenson, a pianist and music director of an opera company who taught music at The New School in New York City.

She was born in the Bronx, New York, where she lived until 1958, when she moved to Brooklyn Heights, also in New York City. In 1962, she moved to Becket, MA. In 1988, she moved to Ypsilanti MI to live near her daughter.
