= Becket Athenaeum =

Library in Becket, Massachusetts

- 42°19′51.19″N 73°05′03.06″W

The Becket Athenaeum, also known as Becket & Washington’s Community Library, is a historic institution in Becket, Massachusetts.

== Architecture and Preservation ==
The library is housed in the former North Congregational Church building, which was built in greek revival style. It still has a wood exterior, though the steeple was removed upon deterioration. Stained glass windows and a bell were relocated to the Federated Church.
