= Sherwood Forest, Massachusetts =

Area in Becket, Massachusetts, U.S.

Coordinates: 42°15′12.96″N 73°5′31.66″W

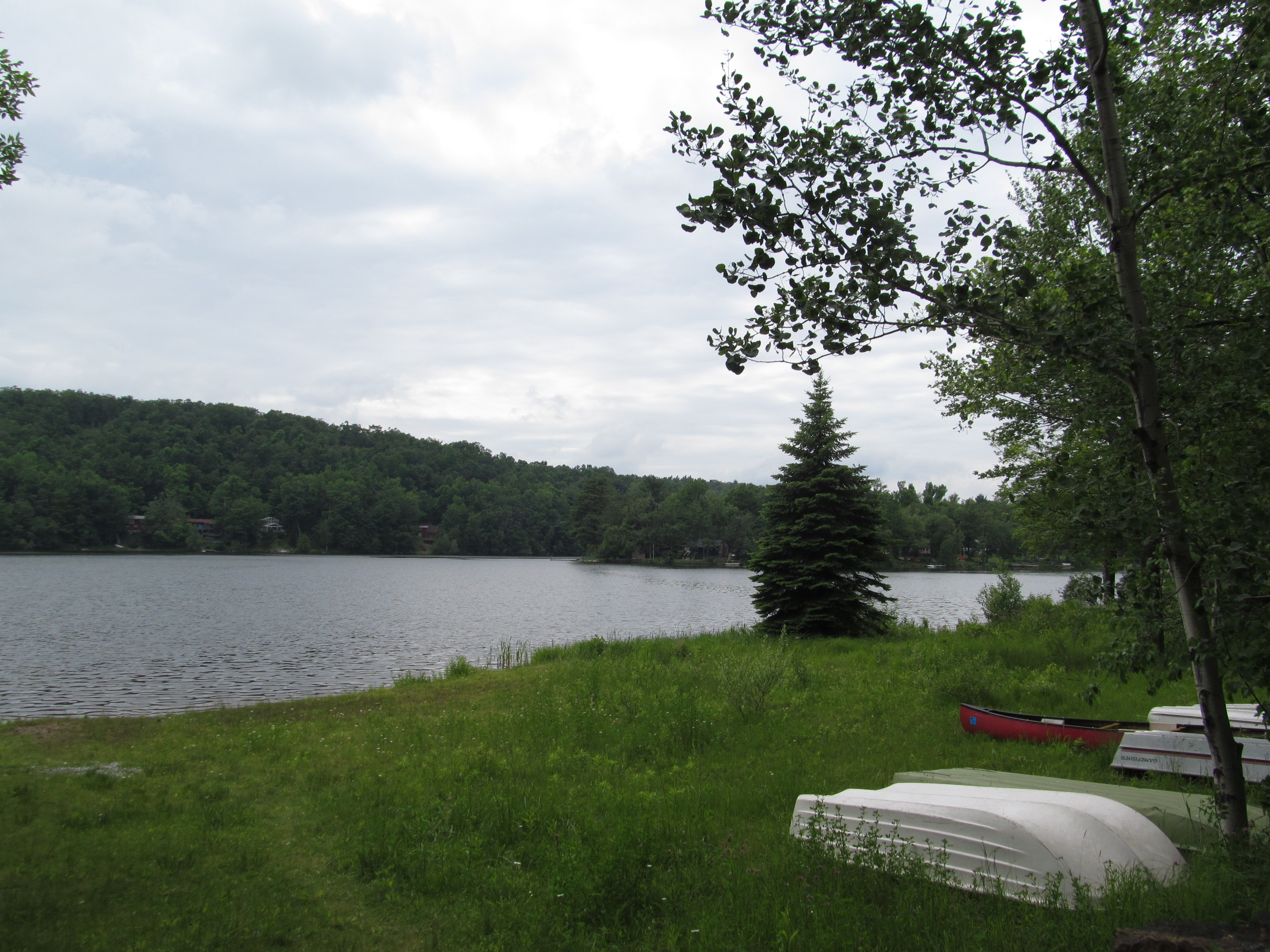
Robin Hood Lake

Sherwood Forest is an area within the town of Becket, Massachusetts. Originally established as a vacation community in the 1960s, the Sherwood Forest Road Maintenance District was established in 1982 with the approval of the Massachusetts State Senate and signed into existence by Governor of Massachusetts Edward J. King. The Sherwood Forest Lake District was established in 2010 to take over maintenance of the community's three lakes and their associated dams.

Through agreement between the town and Sherwood Forest Enterprises, the real estate development company that created the area, the town of Becket is not responsible for things such as asphalt road maintenance and snow removal.

Named after Sherwood Forest in Nottinghamshire, England, with its association with the legend of Robin Hood, this area has street names that include the following:

Maid Marion Lane, Little John Drive, Prince John Drive, King Arthur Drive, Knight Drive, Sir Galahad Drive, Whistling Arrow, Nottingham Courts, Nottingham Circle, Alan A Dale Drive, King Richard Drive, King Richard Lane, Sir George Drive, Black Arrow Way, Golden Knight Lane, Jester's Lane, Jester's Court, Golden Knight Court, Bowman's Lane, Minstrel's Way, Flaming Arrow Lane, Prince Paul Path, Prince Paul Lane, Castle Lane, Olde Carriage Road, Robin Hood Lane, Woodmen's Lane, Forest Lane, Blue-Bowar Lane, Arrowhead Lane, Woodmen's Path, Sir Edward's Way, King Richards Court, Singing Sword Lane, Excalibur Drive, Green Wood Court, Hill-top Court, Mountain Dale Court, Pine Dale Court, Pine Dale Circle, Sir Walter Road, Sir Walter Lane, Count Edward's Way, Excalibur Court, Excalibur Lake Drive, Lady of the Lake Courts
