= Melissa Morgan =

American jazz singer (born 1980)

- Born: 1980 (age 45–46); New York City
- Genre: Jazz
- Occupation: Singer
- Instrument: Piano
- Label: Telarc
- Website: www.melissamorganjazz.com

Melissa Morgan (born 1980) is an American jazz singer.

== Music career ==
Morgan was born in New York City, and grew up in Teaneck, New Jersey, where she attended Teaneck High School. She began studying piano at age four. During high school she began singing with local choirs and was soon performing with vocal groups across the country and abroad. A highlight of her choir experience was a seven-country tour of Europe in 1996 with the U.S. Youth Chorale. As a student she was recognized with numerous awards, including three gold cups in the New Jersey Federation of Music solo piano competition, top ranking in the New Jersey all-state choir, and runner up for the New Jersey Governor's award for vocal music.

In 1998, Morgan entered SUNY Purchase Conservatory of Music and studied with Yolande Bavan of jazz vocal group, Lambert, Hendricks & Bavan, Jon Faddis, Mark Murphy and Roseanna Vitro. While attending Purchase, she appeared with the conservatory's jazz and Latin jazz orchestras and was featured vocalist with the Purchase Jazz Band during a tour of Spain in 1999. In May 2002, she received a degree in jazz vocal performance.

Since graduating from Purchase, Morgan has been a regular performer at some of New York's top jazz room such as Cleopatra's Needle, Flute, G Bar, Smalls, Smoke and St. Nick's Pub. She has appeared with her own trio as well as other artists including Harold Mabern, David Hazeltine, and Sam Yahel. In 2001 she was featured in performances with Jon Faddis and the Dizzy Gillespie Alumni All-Stars at the Blue Note in New York. She performed at the New York Women of Jazz Festival in 2002 at Smoke jazz club, and that same year was a guest on the TV program Where to Hear Jazz in New York City.

In September 2004, Morgan was named a semi-finalist in the Thelonious Monk International Jazz Competition in Washington D.C., hosted by Billy Dee Williams and Herbie Hancock. Judges for the competition were Quincy Jones, Al Jarreau, Kurt Elling, Jimmy Scott, Dee Dee Bridgewater, and Flora Purim.

Her album, Until I Met You (Telarc, 2009), featured Gerald Clayton and Randy Napoleon.

== Albums ==
Year	Album details
2009	Until I Met You: Released: April 2009; Label: Telarc Records
