= Amanda Barnes Smith =

American Mormon pioneer (1809–1886)

- Born: Amanda Barnes; February 22, 1809; Becket, Massachusetts, U.S.
- Died: June 30, 1886 (aged 77); Richmond, Utah, U.S.
- Spouses: Warren Smith; Warren Smith; (Two unrelated men with same name)
- Children: 8

Amanda Barnes Smith (February 22, 1809 – June 30, 1886) was an American Mormon pioneer. She survived the Hawn's Mill massacre of 1838 in Missouri. She also helped organize the first Relief Society in Salt Lake City.

== Early life ==
Amanda Barnes was born on February 22, 1809, in Becket, Massachusetts, to Ezekiel and Fanny Johnson Barnes. She was the fifth of their nine children. Her father did not belong to any religious denomination. Her mother was Presbyterian. After her birth, the family moved to Ohio, where she grew up.

== Conversion ==
Amanda Barnes married Warren Smith when she was 18. He was a blacksmith. She joined the Campbellites when Sidney Rigdon and Orson Hyde shared their beliefs with her. While her husband did not join with her, he consented. She was baptized by Rigdon.

After she had a set of twins, Alma and Alvira, missionaries from the Church of Christ taught her of their beliefs. She was taught by Simeon Carter. She was baptized on April 1, 1831, and her husband was baptized shortly thereafter. In 1832, the family moved to Kirtland, Ohio, selling their house in Amherst, Ohio. Her parents did not approve of their decision to convert and wished to never see them again. As members of the church, she and her husband helped establish the Kirtland Bank and build the Kirtland Temple.

== Hawn's Mill massacre ==
In 1838, the family moved to Missouri and ended up traveling with ten other families that were led by Joseph Young. On the way, the family was stopped by a mob. They were taken back five miles and held by guards. They were kept for three days, and then let go. They arrived at Hawn's Mill, Missouri, on October 28, 1838, on their journey to Far West, Missouri. After being in Hawn's Mill for only two days, a mob of anti-Mormons attacked the settlement. The mob comprised over 200 men. At least 17 members of the church were killed.

Smith was shot at, but not harmed in the shooting. She escaped with her two daughters. The family's house had been robbed and their money was stolen, leaving them with nothing. Smith recorded in her journal that she had lost $50 in goods, $50 in a pocketbook and accounts, $100 in damages, and a gun worth $10.

Smith's son Sardius and her husband were killed in the massacre. Her son Alma was shot and there was nothing remaining of his left hip. Her son Willard recorded the event of the massacre and said that his mother received divine inspiration to heal Alma's shattered hip. She used ashes and made a lye solution to coat the wound. She then used elm roots to make a poultice. Alma's hip recovered after laying in the same position for five weeks.

While Alma was recovering, the family had to stay in Missouri, since the boy could not be moved. There was fear that the mob would strike again. Smith recalls crawling to a corn field and offering a prayer. After praying, she recorded that she heard a voice that repeated the words from "How Firm a Foundation", a Mormon hymn:

That soul who on Jesus hath leaned for repose,
I cannot, I will not desert to its foes:
That soul, though all hell should endeavor to shake,
I'll never, no never, no never forsake!

Throughout this event, Smith states that she had the faith that she and her family would be all right and that God would heal her son.

When Alma was healed, the remaining family members moved to Quincy, Illinois, on February 1, 1839. The news of the apparently miraculous recovery of her son led several physicians to approach her, asking how she had performed the surgery that healed her son. She replied that Jesus Christ had healed him. In Quincy, she became a schoolteacher to support her family.

== Later years and death ==
Smith married another Warren Smith, who was not related to her first husband. With him she had three children. The couple later divorced. She saw the completion of the Nauvoo Temple in July 1847, where she received her endowment. Smith was a member of the Female Relief Society of Nauvoo. She traveled with Emma Smith and Eliza R. Snow to visit the governor of Illinois, Thomas Carlin.

In 1850, Smith traveled westward to the Salt Lake Valley. She helped organize the first Relief Society in Salt Lake City. Smith was called as the Assistant Secretary of the organization on January 24, 1854, and served in that position until Brigham Young reorganized the Relief Society. She later served as the President of Relief Society in the 12th Ward. She also helped in the organization of Sunday School

She died on June 30, 1886, and was buried in Richmond, Utah. At the time of her death, she was visiting her daughter Alvira Hendricks.
