= Jean Liberte =

- Born: March 20, 1896; Italy
- Died: 1965
- Other names: Jean Liberté
- Education: Art Students League of New York, Cooper Union

Jean Liberte (March 20, 1896 – 1965) was an Italian-born American visual artist and teacher. He emigrated to the United States in 1900, and was educated at the Cooper Union. He taught at the Art Students League of New York from 1945 until his death. He was a noted for his use of casein paint.

== Education ==
Liberte graduated from Cooper Union in 1916. He studied at the Art Students League of New York in the 1920s under Kenneth Hayes Miller, where Yasuo Kuniyoshi, Reginald Marsh and Kimon Nicolaides were his classmates.

== Awards ==
- William A. Clark Prize, Corcoran Gallery of Art, Washington D.C., 1945
- Adolph and Clara Obrig Prize, National Academy of Design, 1950
- Audubon Artists, First Prize for Watercolor, 1947
- Audubon Artists, First Prize for Casein Painting, 1948
