= Safford Cape =

American classical musician (1906–1973)

Safford Cape (28 June 1906 – 26 March 1973) was an American conductor, composer and musicologist.

Born and educated in Denver, Colorado, Cape moved to Belgium in 1925 to further his studies in composition and musicology. From 1933, after a few years of chamber music composition, Cape began focusing on the performance of medieval and Renaissance music. To this end, he founded and conducted the Pro Musica Antiqua of Brussels, an ensemble specialising on music from the medieval and Renaissance periods. This group toured throughout Europe and the Americas and produced many recordings. Cape's work inspired Noah Greenberg to form a similar ensemble in America, the New York Pro Musica which was recorded first by EMS Recordings.

For health reasons, Cape retired in 1967 and died in Brussels six years later.
