= Tully Filmus =

American painter (1903–1998)

Tully Filmus (1903 – 1998) was an American realist painter.

== Early life ==
He was born Naftuli (Anatol) Filmus in Ataki, Bessarabia, in 1903. In 1913, his parents Michael and Eva Filmus moved the family to Philadelphia.

== Career ==
From 1924 to 1927, he studied at the Pennsylvania Academy of the Fine Arts under Henry McCarter. In 1930, he moved to New York, where he took a job with a small art agency where he became friends with Anton Refregier and Willem de Kooning. In 1936, he joined American artists in contributing painting to Biro-Bidjan Museum in the U.S.S.R. In 1937, he exhibited at the American Artists Congress and joined the faculty of the American Artists School. In 1938, he also joined the faculty of the Cooper Union School of Art. He has exhibited in the Whitney Museum Annual and the American Artists Congress. One of his paintings was acquired by the permanent collection of New York University. Other museums that have shown his work include the Art Institute of Chicago, City Art Museum of St. Louis, the Brooklyn Museum, and the Berkshire Museum.

== Personal life ==
He and his wife Gladys owned a summer home in Becket, Massachusetts, where they became friends with the painter Fay Kleinman. She later invited them to help launch the Becket Arts Center.
