= Between Friends (Randy Napoleon album) =

Studio album by Randy Napoleon
- Released: 2006
- Genre: Jazz
- Label: Azica Records

Randy Napoleon chronology
| Enjoy the Moment (2002) | Between Friends (2006) | Bitter/Sweet (2011) |

Between Friends, released by Azica Records in 2006, features the Randy Napoleon Trio on half the tracks and a quartet featuring master pianist Benny Green on the others.

The trio is Randy Napoleon (guitar), Jared Gold (organ), and Quincy Davis (drums). The quartet is Napoleon, Davis, Green, and David Wong (bass).

The song Between Friends. does not appear on this album. In the liner notes, Napoleon writes that he selected the title because "This is an album I made with my friends for you to enjoy with yours."

Between Friends is the trio's second album. The first, Enjoy the Moment, released in 2002, was a collaboration between Napoleon and Gold and also featured Davis on drums. The trio has stayed together through the years, even though all three members have had impressive stints as sidemen to other artists in the time between dates with each other.

There is also a history to the collaboration with Benny Green on this album. Both Napoleon and Davis have toured with Green (at different times). In the album liner notes, Napoleon indicates that Green has been an important mentor.

== Track listing ==
1. Face the Truth (Randy Napoleon)
2. No Moon at All (Redd Evans)
3. These Foolish Things (Harry Link, Jack Strachey)
4. These are the Things We Throw Away (Randy Napoleon)
5. Moon and Sand (Alec Wilder, Mortimer S Palitz & Willian C Engvick)
6. Remember (Irving Berlin)
7. Today Is Tomorrow (Randy Napoleon)
8. You're My Everything (Harry Warren)
9. With a Song in My Heart (Richard Rodgers)
10. A Time for Love (Johnny Mandel and Paul Francis Webster)
11. In Good Spirits (Quincy Davis)
