= Amanda Smith (academic) =

Designer and professor in New Zealand

Academic background
- Education: Auckland University of Technology
- Thesis: Seamless knitwear: singularities in design (2013)
- Doctoral advisor: Mark Laurence Jackson, Frances Joseph

Amanda Smith is a New Zealand design academic, and is a full professor at the Auckland University of Technology, specialising in textile design, printed textiles, and seamless knitwear. She previously worked as a knitwear designer in Japan and New Zealand. Smith is head of AUT's School of Design, and founded the Textile and Design Laboratory.

== Academic career ==
Smith completed a Bachelor of Fashion Design with Honours at the University of Gloucestershire, followed by a Master of Design, Knitwear and Knitted Textiles at Nottingham Trent University in 1989. Smith then spent seven years working as Head Designer for Takanashi Design Jimusho in Tokyo, before moving to New Zealand to lead Tapestry Knitwear in Auckland in 2000. She joined the faculty of the Auckland University of Technology (AUT) in 2002, where she was head of the Department of Fashion and Textile Design. Smith completed a PhD titled Seamless knitwear: singularities in design at the Auckland University of Technology (AUT) in 2013. She was appointed as an associate professor in 2017, and then promoted to Professor of Fashion and Textiles in 2022. As of 2024 she is Head of the School of Design at AUT. She lives on Waiheke Island and enjoys shopping for clothes at recycling shops. Smith cites Yohji Yamamoto and Rei Kawakubo as her favourite designers.

Smith's research focuses on the interface of craft and technology, and she is interested in smart textiles, knitted textiles, and seamless knitwear. She is the founder of AUT's Textile and Design Laboratory.

== Selected works ==
- Smith, Amanda; Moore, Rachelle (2019). "Digital Distortion Through Co-creation". Journal of Textile Design Research and Practice. 8 (3): 276–297. doi:10.1080/20511787.2018.1524088. Wikidata Q125164204.
- Smith, Amanda; Finn, Angela Lee (2015). "Built for niche: Rethinking the role of manufacturing in developing designer fashion in New Zealand". International Journal of Fashion Studies. 2 (1): 29–42. doi:10.1386/infs.2.1.29_1. Wikidata Q125164207.
- Otter, Simon; Rome, Keith; Belinda Ihaka; Andrew South; Smith, Amanda; Amit Gupta; Joseph, Frances; Peter Heslop (2015). "Protective socks for people with diabetes: a systematic review and narrative analysis". Journal of Foot and Ankle Research. 8: 9. doi:10.1186/s13047-015-0068-7. PMC 4431172. PMID 25977708. Wikidata Q38482426.
- Smith, Amanda (2016). "Harnessing the Haptic in Mass Production Seamless Knitwear Technologies". International Journal of Designed Objects. 10 (3): 19–29. doi:10.18848/2325-1379/cgp/v10i03/19-29. Wikidata Q125164208.
- Amanda Smith. Section 2. Textiles Materials and Processes. Disrupting digital making for seamless knit design, in Textiles, Identity and Innovation: In Touch. CRC Press. 2020. doi:10.1201/9780429286872. ISBN 978-0-429-28687-2. Wikidata Q125164205.
