= Quincy Davis (musician) =

American jazz musician

Quincy Davis (born August 27, 1977 in Grand Rapids, Michigan) is a jazz drummer who has recorded with Tom Harrell, Benny Green, Hank Jones, Kurt Elling, The Clayton Brothers, Gerald Clayton, Russell Malone, Frank Wess, Eric Lewis, Junko Onishi, Ernestine Anderson, Vincent Gardner, and Randy Napoleon.

== Biography ==
Davis grew up in a musical family in Grand Rapids, Michigan. His brother is pianist Xavier Davis. He often played with his brother in their home. In grade school, he also picked up the trumpet and tuba. Near the end of his high school career, he attended the Interlochen Arts Academy in northern Michigan. There he played jazz in a group setting and studied classical percussion and trap-set drumming.

== Discography ==
=== As a leader ===
- 2013 Songs in the Key of Q
- 2020 Q Vision

=== As sideman ===
With Tom Harrell

- 2002 Live at the Village Vanguard
- 2003 Wise Children

With Vincent Gardner

- 2006 Elbow Room
- 2007 The Good Book Chapter 1
- 2008 Vin-Slidin'

With Aaron Diehl

- 2011 Live at Live at the Players
- 2015 Space Time Continuum

With Sachal Vasandani

- 2007 Eyes Wide Open
- 2009 We Move

With Peter Zak

- 2008 Seed of Sin
- 2009 Blues on the Corner

With Randy Napoleon

- 2003 Enjoy the Moment
- 2006 Between Friends
- 2011 The Jukebox Crowd

With David Gibson

- 2006 G-Rays'
- 2009 A Little Somethin'
- 2010 End of the Tunnel'

With Jared Gold

- 2010 All Wrapped Up
- 2011 Golden Child'

With James Danderfer

- 2004 Run with It
- 2015 Time and Tide
- 2020 All the Flowers'

With Young Joo Song

- 2006 Falling Free
- 2008 Journey'

With Greg Glassman

- 2002 Onward and Upward
- 2007 Into the Wild'

With others

- 2006 Lost in New York, Matt Ray
- 2006 Ballade Pour Adeline, Adam Birnbaum
- 2007 And So Am I, Darmon Meador
- 2008 From the Heart, Bobby Watson
- 2008 Purple Butterfly, Daniela Schaechter
- 2008 Ballads - All Night', Marcus Printup
- 2008 Lite Blue', Takuji Yamada
- 2009 Impromptu, Ted Rosenthal
- 2009 My Foolish Heart, Maya Hatch
- 2009 Introducing Takao Iwaki, Takao Iwaki
- 2010 Out of the World, Ted Rosenthal
- 2010 Keystone, Dave Stryker
- 2010 See the Pyramid, Walt Weiskopf
- 2010 Little Echo', Ken Fowser
- 2013 Some Other Time, Ayako Shirasaki
- 2014 Leslie Odom Jr., Leslie Odom Jr.
- 2015 Debut: Noriko Ueda Trio, Noriko Ueda
- 2015 Alto Gusto: Live at the Yardbird Suite, P.J. Perry
- 2017 Halcyon, Will Bonness
- 2017 Jazz Standards, Jon Gordon
- 2019 Elegant Traveler, Jocelyn Gould
- 2020 Rise Up Detroit, Xavier Davis
