= Upper Historic District (Washington, Massachusetts) =

Historic district in Massachusetts, United States

- U.S. National Register of Historic Places
- U.S. Historic district
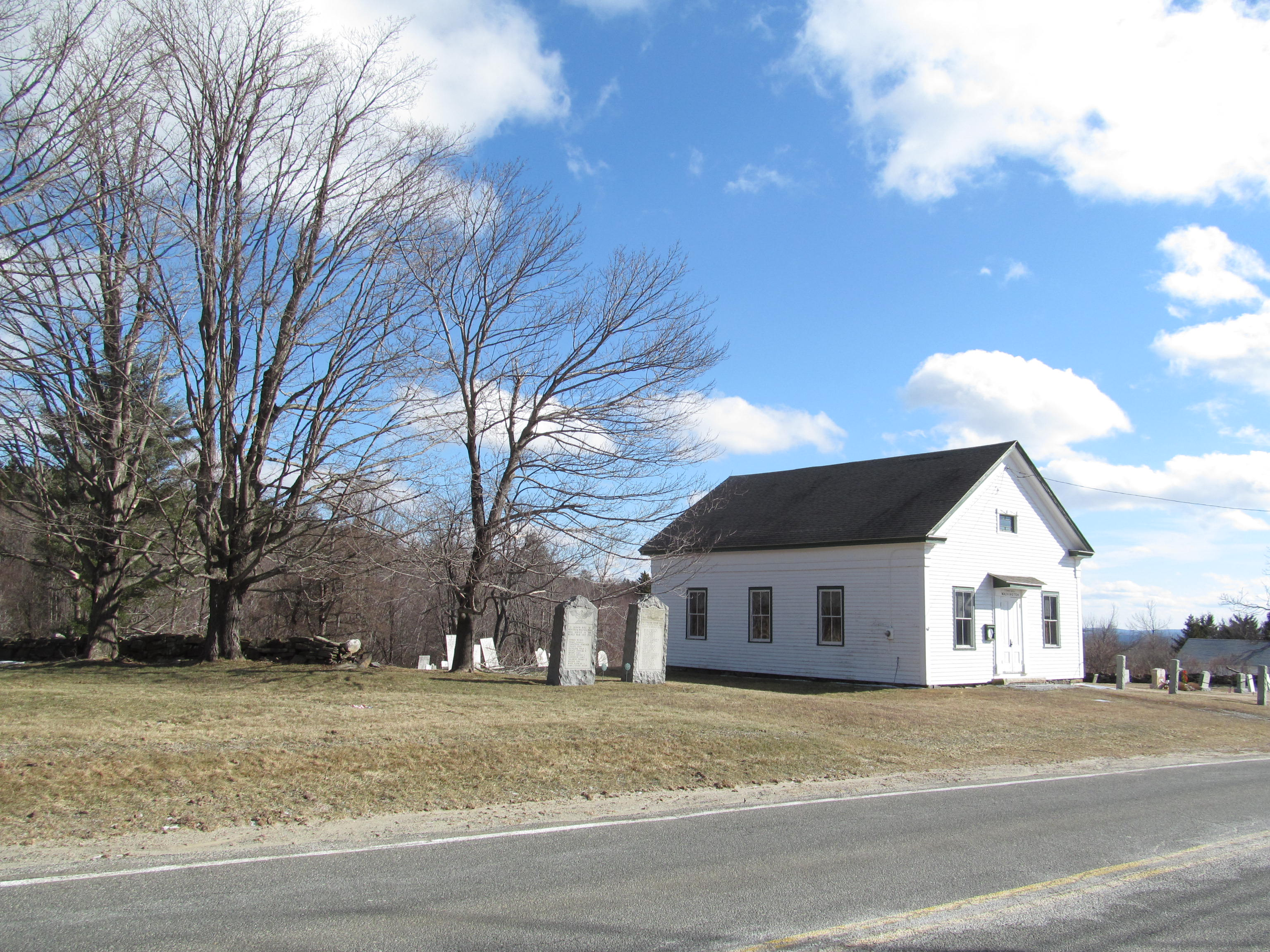
- The old town hall

- Location within Massachusetts Location within the United States
- Location: Washington, Massachusetts
- Coordinates: 42°21′48″N 73°8′37″W
- Area: 32.1 acres (13.0 ha)
- Architectural style: Greek Revival, Federal
- MPS: Washington MRA
- NRHP reference No.: 86002145
- Added to NRHP: September 2, 1987

The Upper Historic District is a historic district encompassing the historic center of Washington, Massachusetts. Centered on the junction of Washington Mountain Road and Branch Road, the town center flourished from the town's establishment in the 1750s until the center of the town's business moved closer to the newly lain railroad in the 1830s. The district includes the old town hall, cemetery, common, and pound, as well as a number of residences. A meeting house (church) and schoolhouse once stood in the area, but the 1792 church was destroyed by lightning in 1859, and the schoolhouse is no longer extant. The district was added to the National Register of Historic Places in 1987. It was listed as part of the Washington Multiple Property Submission (MPS).

== Description and history ==
The town of Washington is a rural community in the uplands of the Berkshires in western Massachusetts. Its early points of settlement were along Washington Mountain Road, which skirts the eastern flank of Washington Mountain and served as an early stagecoach route between Pittsfield and Springfield. The town center arose near the highest point on the road, where its first meeting house was built around 1773. That building no longer stands, but the 10-acre (4.0 ha) town common that was laid out next to it still survives as a large grassy expanse at the corner of Branch Road. The oldest surviving structure in this area is the animal pound, a rectangular stone structure built in 1783. The current town cemetery was established on the east side of Washington Mountain Road in 1805, and contains a few burials relocated from the town's first burying ground, which was also nearby. The historic town hall is next to the cemetery, built in 1848–49 and still occasionally used for civic functions. The two oldest houses in the district are the Elijah Crane House, built c. 1785–89, and the Jasper Morgan Tavern, built c. 1810–11. Both are good examples of Federal period architecture.

Washington has always been a rural community, its early farmers struggling with poor soil and harsh climate. As a consequence, many began to leave as early as 1810 for better lands in Ohio and other areas further west. The town center consequently stagnated, and was supplanted even in civic importance by the routing of a railroad line further in the valley, where most of the town's civic and economic activity is now focused.

== See also ==
- National Register of Historic Places listings in Berkshire County, Massachusetts
