= Jack Skurnick =

American record producer (1910–1952)

Jack Skurnick (March 22, 1910 – September 6, 1952) was an American record producer and writer, known as the founder and director of EMS Recordings and as publisher and editor of the music review Just Records.

Jack Skurnick

== Career ==
Skurnick worked in the "Elaine Music Shop" a music store owned by his parents, Max and Anna Skurnick. Before it closed it could be found at 9 East 44th Street in New York. Doris Day bought records there, and many classical musicians came in to make purchases and chat with Skurnick. One of these was Edgard Varèse. Another was Safford Cape, director of Pro Musica Antiqua. When Skurnick started his record company, EMS Recordings, he named it after the shop. He also convinced Cape and Varese to record with him. EMS was the first label to record Varese.

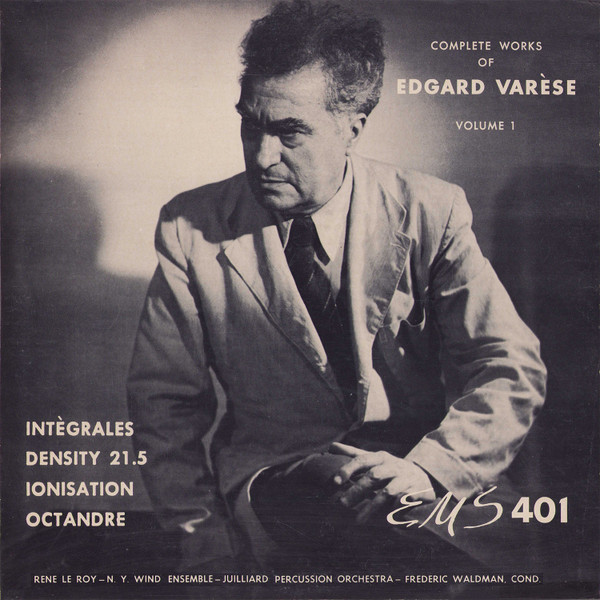
first recording of the music of Edgard Varese, EMS recordings

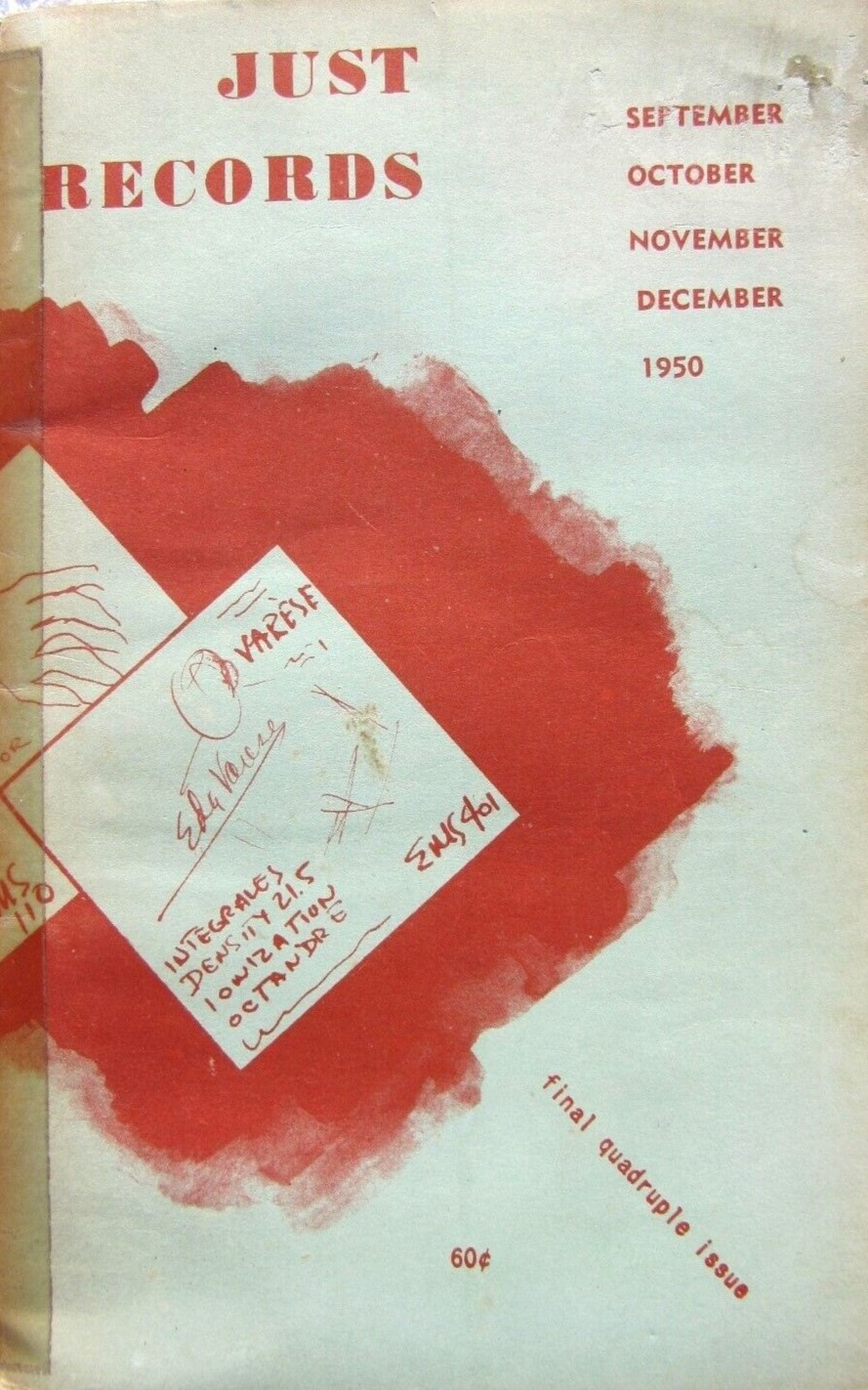

In the magazine Skurnick sought to build respect for music as an art and to raise performance standards.

In the EMS recordings, he put these principles into practice. His aim was to record a history of music, with special attention to the lesser known masterpieces, in performances that would be a model of authentic musicianship. He had mapped out plans far into the future when his work was suddenly interrupted.

== Interests ==
A movie buff, he wrote a script that he shot himself. Film director Jules Dassin, then an actor at the Artef, a Jewish theater in New York, appeared in it. It was shown to a small group at a space Skurnick rented in New York but never released beyond that. A fan of old movies, Skurnick twice rented a hall in which to show them. Because he was not able to afford to rent the space regularly, he suggested the project to Betty Chamberlain, Director of the Department of Communications at The Museum of Modern Art from 1948–53, who subsequently introduced a more elaborate series of films at MoMA.

== Personal ==
Skurnick was married to the painter Fay Kleinman for 18 years, until his death and had one daughter, Davida. Since her marriage, Davida has been known as Davi Napoleon.

Skurnick died of a heart attack on September 6, 1952, at the age of 42.
