= Becket, Massachusetts =

Town in Massachusetts, United States

- Town
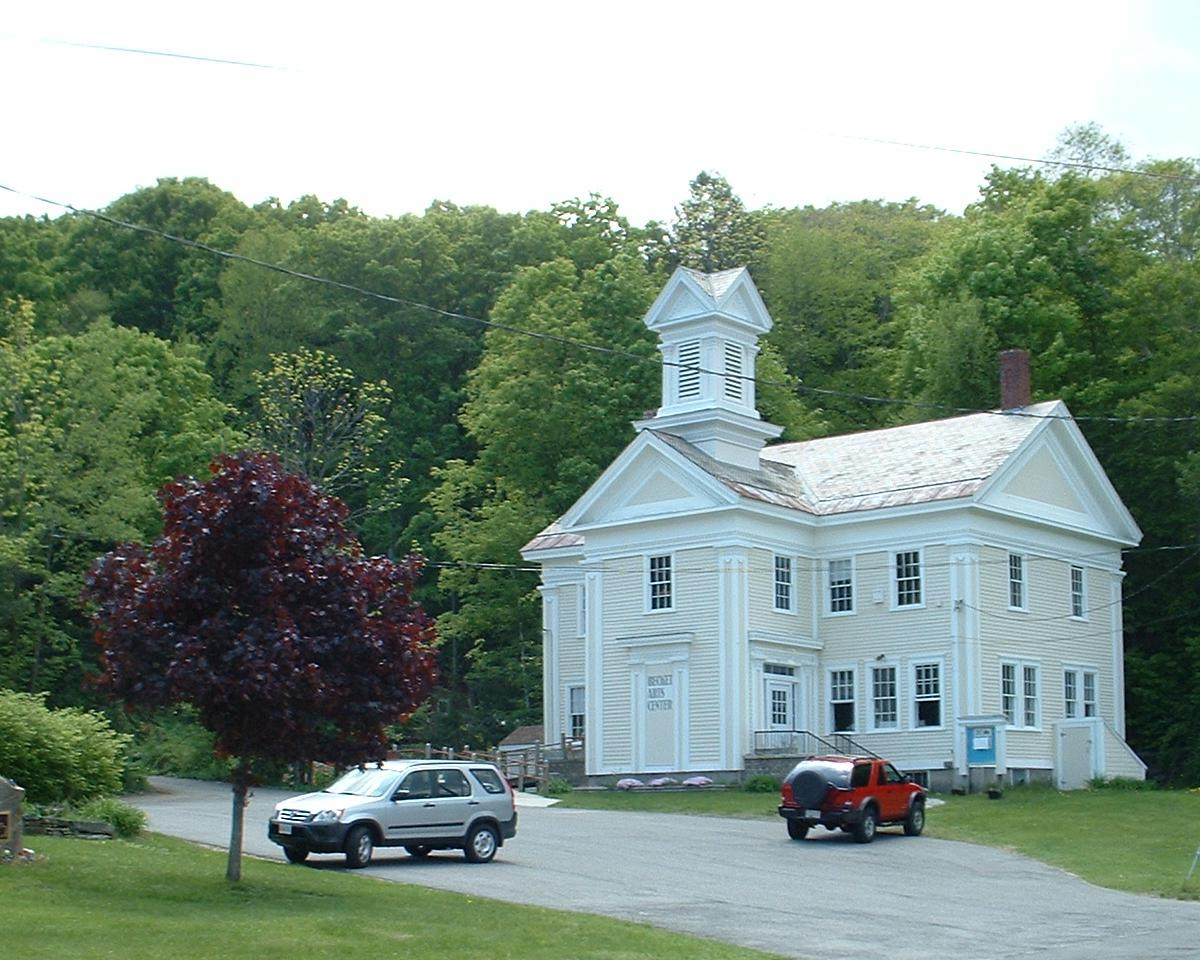
- Becket Arts Center, 2005

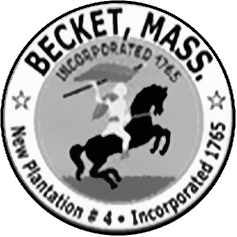
- Seal

- Location in Berkshire County and the state of Massachusetts.
- Coordinates: 42°19′55″N 73°05′00″W
- Country: United States
- State: Massachusetts
- County: Berkshire
- Settled: 1740
- Incorporated: 1765

Government
  - Type: Open town meeting

Area
  - Total: 47.8 sq mi (123.8 km^{2})
  - Land: 46.1 sq mi (119.3 km^{2})
  - Water: 1.7 sq mi (4.5 km^{2})
- Elevation: 1,201 ft (366 m)

Population (2020)
  - Total: 1,931
  - Density: 41.92/sq mi (16.19/km^{2})
- Time zone: UTC−5 (Eastern)
  - Summer (DST): UTC−4 (Eastern)
- ZIP Code: 01223
- Area code: 413
- FIPS code: 25-04545
- GNIS feature ID: 0619416
- Website: www.townofbecket.org

Becket is a town in Berkshire County, Massachusetts, United States. It is part of the Pittsfield, Massachusetts Metropolitan Statistical Area. The population was 1,931 at the 2020 census.

== History ==
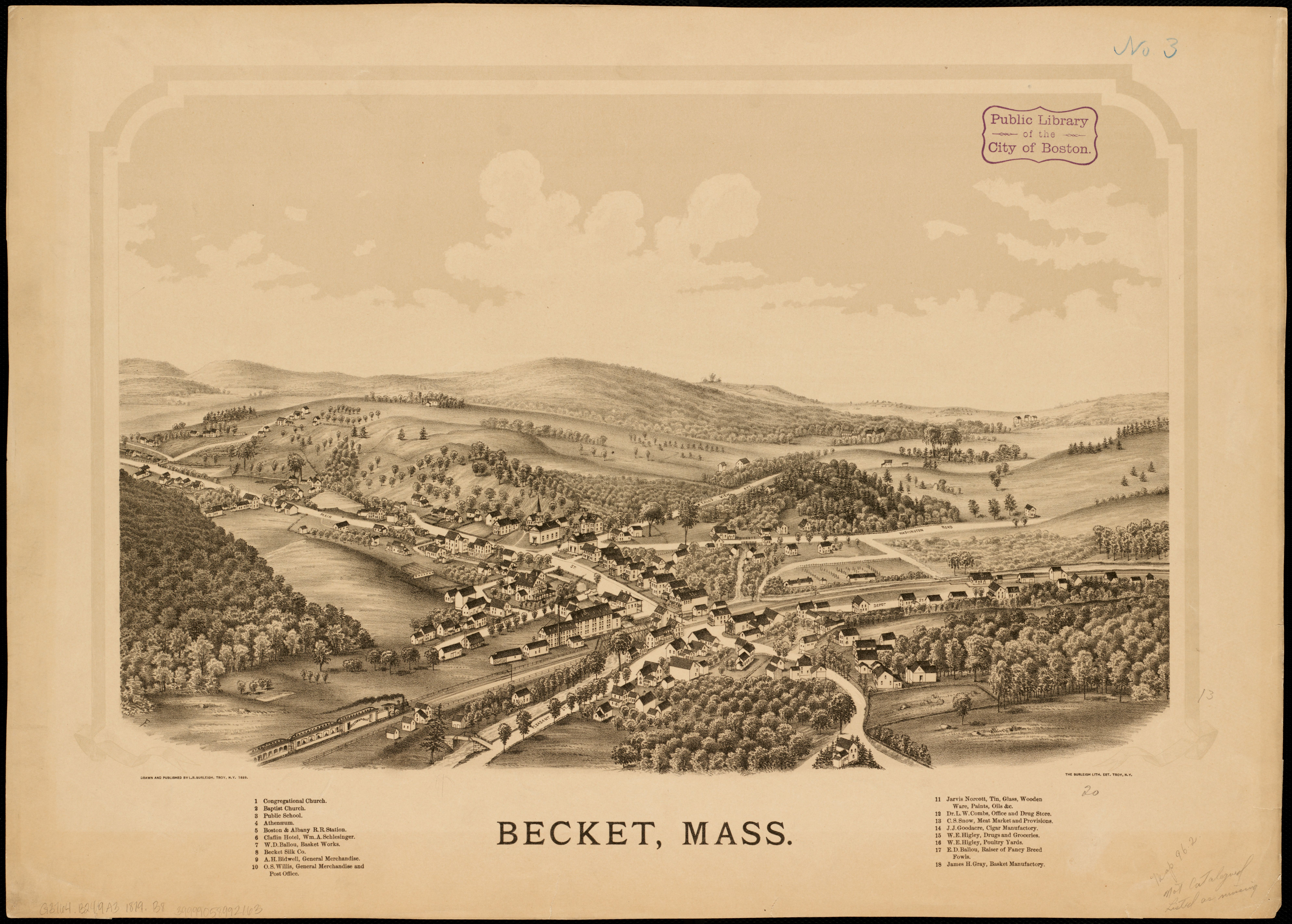
Lithograph of Beckett from 1889 by L. R. Burleigh with list of landmarks

Becket was first settled in 1740, and was officially incorporated in 1765.

The original "Beckett" for which the town of Becket was named is an estate or "tithing" that once belonged to the Admiral Lord Barrington (the namesake of "Great Barrington, Massachusetts"). It is located in Shrivenham, formerly in Berkshire, England, about five miles east of the important railroad town of Swindon.

Sir Francis Bernard, the Royal Governor of Massachusetts in 1765, was a close friend of Lord Barrington and was himself a native of Berkshire, England. Bernard often went on holiday in the beautiful surroundings of Beckett, and that these pleasant memories influenced him in 1765 to give the name Becket to Township Number Four when he approved its incorporation.

In 1811, 16 men from Becket traveled to the Western Reserve and founded the village of Windham, Ohio.

The early town was the site of an experiment in the late eighteenth century involving the local church. Seeing the problems involved with communities who supported congregational churches, the town established its own church society, where local citizens supported the church without any tax monies. It was one of the first frontier communities to employ this model of supporting churches.

From its earliest days, Becket was involved in the woodland industries of lumber and quarries. As time went on, dairy production, basketry and silk also were products of the town. After a flood in the early twentieth century, most of the industries died out, and today Becket is mostly known as a resort town with an artists' community surrounding the Jacob's Pillow Company.

== Geography ==
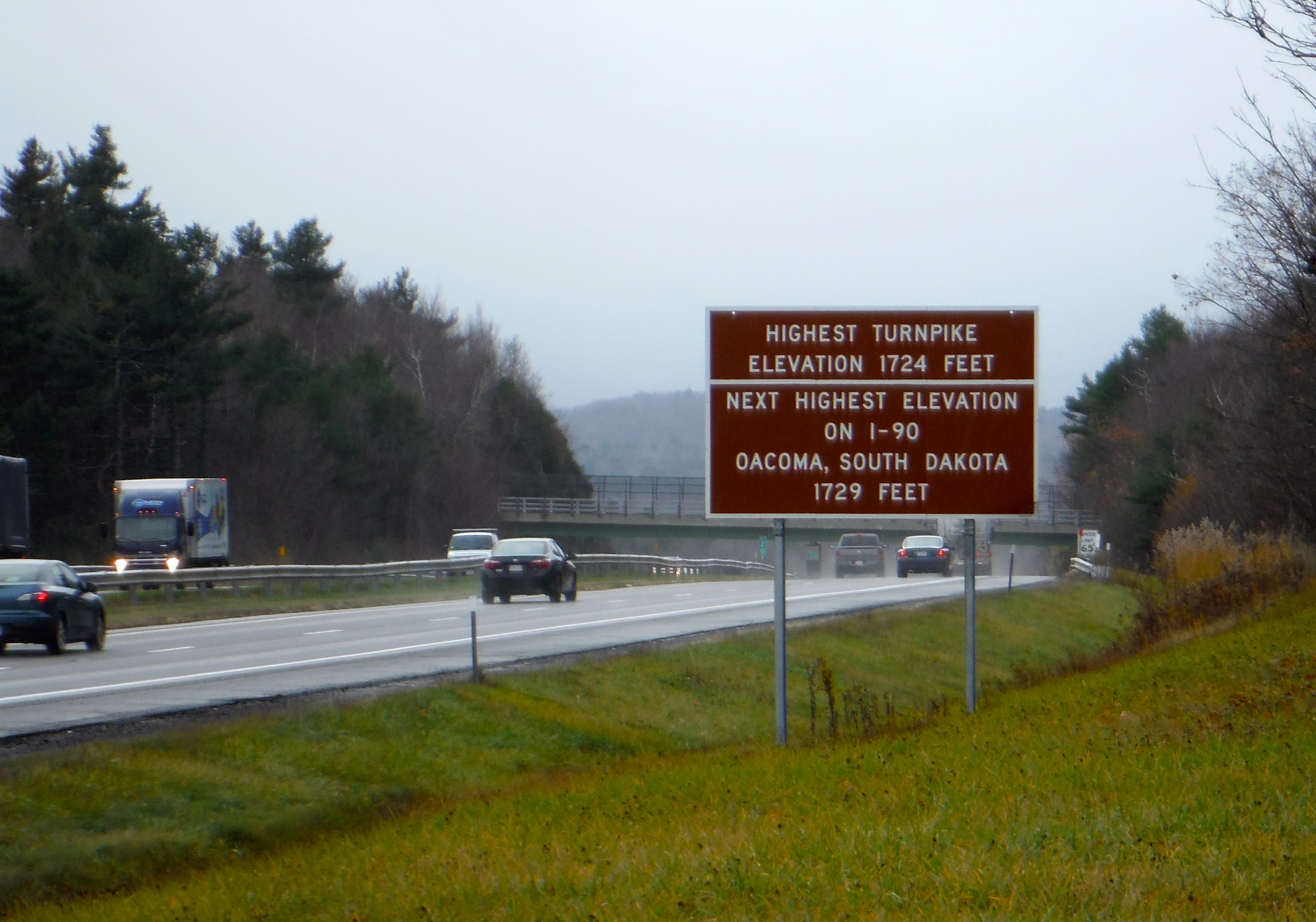
This sign for westbound traffic is located in Becket, Massachusetts; however Oacoma, South Dakota has not reciprocated this notable feature of Interstate 90 with a similar sign for eastbound traffic.

According to the United States Census Bureau, the town has a total area of 47.8 square miles (123.8 km^{2}), of which 46.1 square miles (119.3 km^{2}) is land and 1.7 square miles (4.5 km^{2}), or 3.62%, is water. Becket is located on the eastern border of Berkshire County, at the junction of Hampshire County and Hampden County. Becket is bordered by Washington to the northwest, Middlefield to the northeast, Chester to the east, Blandford to the southeast, Otis to the south, and Tyringham and Lee to the west. Becket is 17 miles (27 km) southeast of Pittsfield, 32 miles (51 km) northwest of Springfield, and 118 miles (190 km) west of Boston.

Becket is located in the southern Berkshire Mountains, and is dotted with hills on the interior, and surrounded on two sides by Becket Mountain and Walling Mountain to the west, and Mount Gobble to the east. The west branch of the Westfield River flows along much of the Middlefield town line, flowing eastward towards Chester. Several marshy brooks flow through the town, and there are several ponds, lakes and the Palmer Brook Reservoir. Along the river, a small portion of the Walnut Hill Wildlife Management Area lies within the town, and to the west, the southeastern corner of October Mountain State Forest. The Appalachian Trail passes through the western part of town, circumventing the town of Lee while heading from Tyringham to Washington over Becket Mountain.

Interstate 90, the Massachusetts Turnpike, passes through town, with the nearest exit (Exit 2) being in neighboring Lee. The town also lies along U.S. Route 20, which is the main east–west route through the town. Massachusetts Route 8 runs concurrently with U.S. 20 for 5 miles (8 km) starting at the center of town, with the majority of the town's population residing around Robin Hood Lake south of this stretch. A portion of the CSX Berkshire Subdivision rail line passes along the river valley, providing access between Pittsfield and Springfield. The nearest rail, bus and regional air service can be found in Pittsfield, with the nearest national air service coming from Bradley International Airport in Windsor Locks, Connecticut.

== Demographics ==
Historical population
Year	Pop.	±%
1790	751	—
1850	1,223	+62.8%
1860	1,578	+29.0%
1870	1,346	−14.7%
1880	1,123	−16.6%
1890	946	−15.8%
1900	994	+5.1%
1910	959	−3.5%
1920	674	−29.7%
1930	672	−0.3%
1940	689	+2.5%
1950	755	+9.6%
1960	770	+2.0%
1970	929	+20.6%
1980	1,339	+44.1%
1990	1,481	+10.6%
2000	1,755	+18.5%
2010	1,779	+1.4%
2020	1,931	+8.5%
2022*	1,931	+0.0%
* = population estimate. Source: United States census records and Population Estimates Program data.

As of the census of 2000, there were 1,755 people, 692 households, and 505 families residing in the town. In terms of population, Becket ranks fourteenth out of the 32 cities and towns in Berkshire County, and 297th out of the 351 cities and towns in Massachusetts. The population density was 37.9 inhabitants per square mile (14.6/km^{2}), ranking it 19th in the county and 322nd in the Commonwealth. There were 1,451 housing units at an average density of 31.4 per square mile (12.1/km^{2}). The racial makeup of the town was 97.44% White, 0.68% African American, 0.17% Native American, 0.51% Asian, 0.11% from other races, and 1.08% from two or more races. Hispanic or Latino of any race were 1.08% of the population.

There were 692 households, out of which 30.9% had children under the age of 18 living with them, 61.7% were married couples living together, 6.5% had a female householder with no husband present, and 27.0% were non-families. Of all households, 22.0% were made up of individuals, and 7.7% had someone living alone who was 65 years of age or older. The average household size was 2.50 and the average family size was 2.92.

In the town, the population was spread out, with 23.6% under the age of 18, 5.6% from 18 to 24, 29.2% from 25 to 44, 28.6% from 45 to 64, and 13.0% who were 65 years of age or older. The median age was 41 years. For every 100 females, there were 101.3 males. For every 100 females age 18 and over, there were 101.4 males.

The median income for a household in the town was $46,806, and the median income for a family was $53,417. Males had a median income of $40,774 versus $30,300 for females. The per capita income for the town was $21,861. About 3.2% of families and 4.5% of the population were below the poverty line, including 5.0% of those under age 18 and 3.7% of those age 65 or over.

== Government ==
Becket employs the open town meeting form of government, and is led by a board of selectmen and administrative assistant. The town has a police station near the geographic center of town (the area known as Becket Center), and a post office also in Becket Center (the post office was moved from North Becket to Becket Center in the early 2000s). There are two fire stations, one in North Becket and the other located near the Sherwood Forest housing community (along Routes 8 & 20). The nearest hospital, Berkshire Medical Center, is located in Pittsfield.

On the state level, Becket is represented in the Massachusetts House of Representatives by William Smitty Pignatelli, since 2003, as part of the 4th Berkshire district, which covers southern Berkshire County. Leigh Davis became state rep after Smitty retired in 2024. In the Massachusetts Senate, the town is part of the Berkshire, Hampshire, Franklin and Hampden district, and is represented by Benjamin B. Downing since 2006. Current state senator is Paul Mark. The district includes all of Berkshire County and western Hampshire and Franklin counties.

The town is patrolled by the First (Lee) Station of Barracks "B" of the Massachusetts State Police.

On the national level, Becket is represented in the United States House of Representatives as part of Massachusetts's 1st congressional district represented by Democrat Richard Neal. As of July 2013, Massachusetts is represented in the United States Senate by senior Senator Elizabeth Warren and junior Senator Ed Markey, both Democrats as well.

== Education ==
Becket is one of the seven towns in the Central Berkshire Regional School District, the largest district (by land area) in the Commonwealth. Students in Becket attend the Becket-Washington Elementary School in town for elementary school. Students in the district travel to Dalton to attend Nessacus Regional Middle School for sixth through eighth grades and Wahconah Regional High School for the high grades. A great number of Becket students travel to Lee for education and attend Lee Elementary School for grades K–6 and Lee Middle and High School. There are no private schools in Becket, the nearest being in Lee and the Pittsfield area.

The nearest community college is Berkshire Community College in Pittsfield. The nearest state college is Westfield State University in Westfield, and the nearest state university is the University of Massachusetts Amherst. The nearest private college is Smith College in Northampton.

== Points of interest ==
- Becket Arts Center, founded by pianist Emanuel Levenson and painter Fay Kleinman
- Becket Athenaeum
- Camp Greylock
- Jacob's Pillow Dance Festival
- Camp Becket

== Notable people ==
- Horace Chapman, Wisconsin lawyer and Free Soil legislator
- Theodore S. Chapman, Illinois lawyer and state legislator
- Ken Cheeseman, theatre and film actor
- Wendell Corey, actor. Buried in North Cemetery
- Hannah Tracy Cutler, abolitionist and women's rights advocate
- Tully Filmus, painter and member of the original board of directors at the Becket Arts Center (summer resident)
- Norman Wait Harris, American banker, founder of what is now today BMO Harris Bank
- Fay Kleinman, painter and co-founder of the Becket Arts Center
- Michio and Aveline Kushi, leaders of the worldwide macrobiotic movement
- Emanuel Levenson, pianist and opera director; co-founder of the Becket Arts Center
- Peg Lynch, radio and television personality (Ethel and Albert)
- Joseph Plumb Martin, soldier in the Revolutionary War, born in Becket in 1760. He lived there until the age of seven, when he was sent to live with his grandparents in Milford, Connecticut
- Bishop Perkins, politician, Democratic congressman from New York
- Amanda Barnes Smith, Mormon pioneer
- Eliza R. Snow, early Mormon historian, poet, and women's leader
