= EMS Recordings =

EMS Recordings was founded in 1949 by Jack Skurnick in New York City. The company won first prize at the Audio Fair of 1950 for the high quality and interest of its recordings. It issued the first recording of works of Edgard Varese.

Skurnick's parents, Max and Anna Skurnick, owned a record store on West 44th street, named the Elaine Music Shop after the wife of a previous owner. Skurnick, a musicologist and amateur violinist, helped out there. When he started his record company, he named it after the store. He died in 1952.

During his short lifetime, Skurnick produced three series for EMS, Pro Musica Antiqua, Forecasts in Music, and Survey of the Art Song. These were all released as long-playing records only.

== Discography ==
Beethoven, Octet in E flat major, opus 103 and Rondino in E flat major, grove 146, Little Orchestra Society, Thomas Scherman, conductor (EMS 1)

Joseph Hayden, Partita in F Major, EMS Chamber Orchestra, Edvard Fendler, conductor; Sonatas in D Major and A Flat Major, Charles Rosen, Piano (EMS 3)

Farnaby Canzonets and Virginals, Oriana Singers conducted by Charles M. Hobbs (EMS 5)

Pro Musica Antiqua

EMS presents music composed before the eighteenth century, performed authentically.

- Sacred and Secular Music of the 12th and 13th Centuries. Pro Musica Antiqua of Brussels, conducted by Safford Cape. A collection of works by Adam de la Halle, Leoninus, Perotin, and others. (EMS 201)
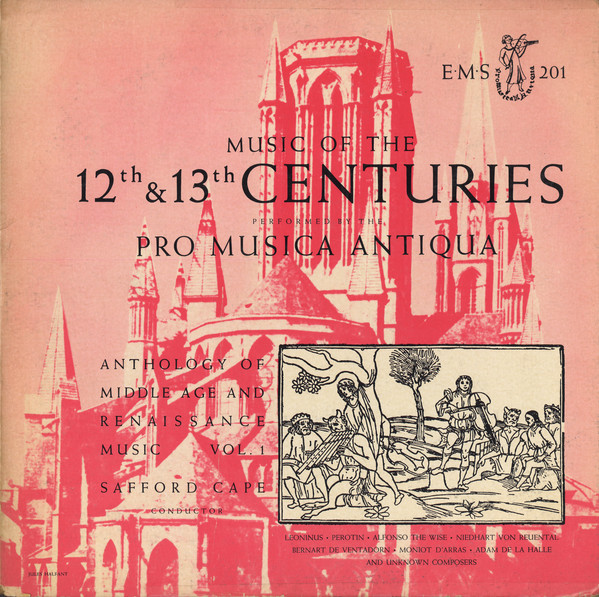
  EMS recording- Music of the 12th and 13th Centuries
- Dufay, Guillaume: Secular Works. Safford Cape. 13 Chansons and instrumental pieces by the greatest composer of the first half of the 15th century. (EMS 206)
- Des Prez, Josquin: Secular Works. Safford Cape. 14 Chansons and instrumental pieces by the late 15th century "Prince of Music." (EMS 213)
- Spanish Music from the Court of Ferdinand and Isabella. Safford Cape. Nineteen vocal and instrumental pieces by Juan del Enrico and contemporaries. (EMS 219)
- Byrd, William: The Four and Five Part Masses. Safford Cape. Two major works by the "Parent of British Music." (EMS 234)
- Prezel, Johann: Tower and Festive Music for Brass. EMS Brass Ensemble conducted by Gunther Schuller. (EMS 7)
- Marais, Marin: Suites for Viola Da Gamba and Harpsichord. Eve Heinitz, viola da gamba; Ernst Victor Wolff, harpsichord. Suites IV and V in A minor and A major respectively, plus a prelude in D minor. (EMS 8)
- Dowland, John: Lachrimae or Seaven Teares. Geneva Chamber Ensemble conducted by Franz Walter. "Seaven passionate pavana, with divers other pavans, galiards, and almands, set forth for the lute, viols or violins, in five parts." Dowland's only purely instrumental composition, much of it based on his beautiful songs. (EMS 12)

Forecasts in Music

- Varese, Edgard: Integrales/Density 21.5/Ionization/Octandre. Rene le Roy, flute; Juilliard Percussion Orchestra and New York Wind Ensemble conducted by Frederic Waldman. EMS went out on a limb with this record, but music lovers, hi-fi addicts, composers, and EMS never regretted it. Frank Zappa has said he was influenced by this music. (EMS 401)

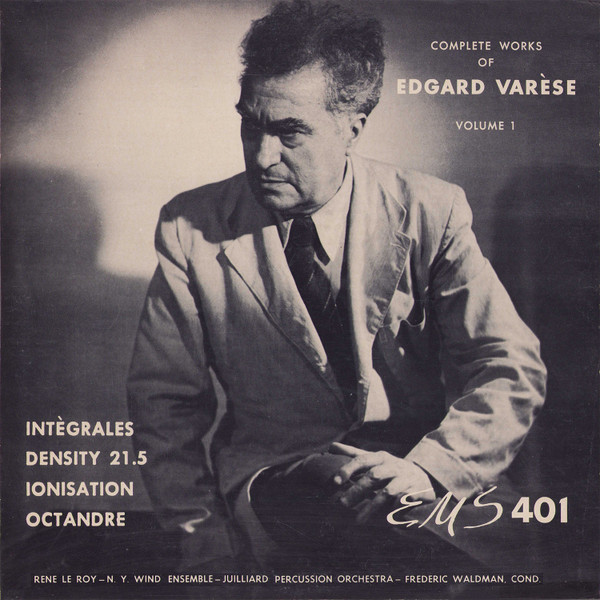
first recording of the music of Edgard Varese, EMS recordings

- Overton, Hall: Sonata for Viola and Piano (1960)/ Sonatoa for Cello and Piano (1960). Walter Trampler, viola; Charles McCracken, cello; Lucy Greene, piano. (EMS 403)
- Martinu, Bohuslav: Sonata for Flute and Piano; Two Polkas/Tree Etudes/Les Ritournelles for Piano. Rene Le Roy, flute, George Reeves, piano; Charles Rosen, piano. (EMS 2)
- Hindemith, Paul: Sonata for Trumpet and Piano / Sonata for Bassoon and Piano / Sonata for Trombone and Piano. Alex Wilson, trumpet; Bernard Garfield, bassoon; Roger Smith, Trombone; Theodore Lettvin, piano. These sonatas may be defined as Gebrauchmusik, but they are not mere utilitarian pieces but works of emotional and dramatic impact.
- Milhaud, Darius: Sonata for Flute, Oboe, Clarinet, and Piano/La Cheminee Du Roi Tene/Pastorale for Oboe, Clarinet, and Bassoon. Samuel Baron, flute; Ralph Gombert, oboe; Wallace Shapiro, clarinet; Bernard Garfield, bassoon; Milton Kaye, piano.
- Villa-Lobos, Heitor: The Baby's Family Suite (also known as The Children's Doll Suite / The Three Maries / Rudepoêma. Jacques Abrams, piano. (EMS 10)

Survey of the Art Song

- Griffes, Charles Tomlinson: Eight Songs. Grieg, Edvard: Nine Songs. Norman Myrvik, tenor; Emanuel Levenson, piano. (EMS 501)
- Piano Sonatas of Franz Schubert performed by Webster Aitken:

Sonata in A Minor, Opus 42 (EMS 107) Sonata in D Major, Opus 53 (EMS 108) Sonata in G Major, Opus 78 (EMS 109) Sonata in G Minor, Opus Posth (EMS 110) Sonata in A Major, Opus Posth (EMS 111) Sonata in B Flat Major, Opus Posth (EMS 112)
