= Massachusetts Route 8A =

State highway in western Massachusetts, US

Route 8A

Route information
- Maintained by MassDOT
- Length: 39.01 mi (62.78 km)
- Existed: ca. 1950–present

Route 8A-L
- Length: 35.85 mi (57.69 km)
- South end: Route 8 / Route 9 in Dalton
- Major intersections: Route 9 in Windsor; Route 116 from Savoy to Plainfield; Route 2 in Charlemont
- North end: VT 8A at the Vermont state line near Heath

Route 8A-U
- Length: 3.17 mi (5.10 km)
- South end: Route 8 in North Adams
- North end: Route 2 / Route 8 in North Adams

Location
- Country: United States
- State: Massachusetts
- Counties: Berkshire, Hampshire, Franklin

Highway system
- Massachusetts State Highway System; Interstate; US; State
← Route 8	→ Route 9

Route 8A refers to two separate north–south state highways in western Massachusetts in the United States. Both sections are marked as "Route 8A" on guide signs and reassurance markers. In official documentation, MassHighway denotes one highway as 8A-U, and the other as 8A-L, for "upper" and "lower", respectively.

Unlike Route 2A and other suffixed Massachusetts state highways with multiple sections, both 8A-U and 8A-L bypass the same portion of Route 8, possibly causing confusion for travelers unfamiliar with the area.

== Route 8A-L ==
=== Route description ===
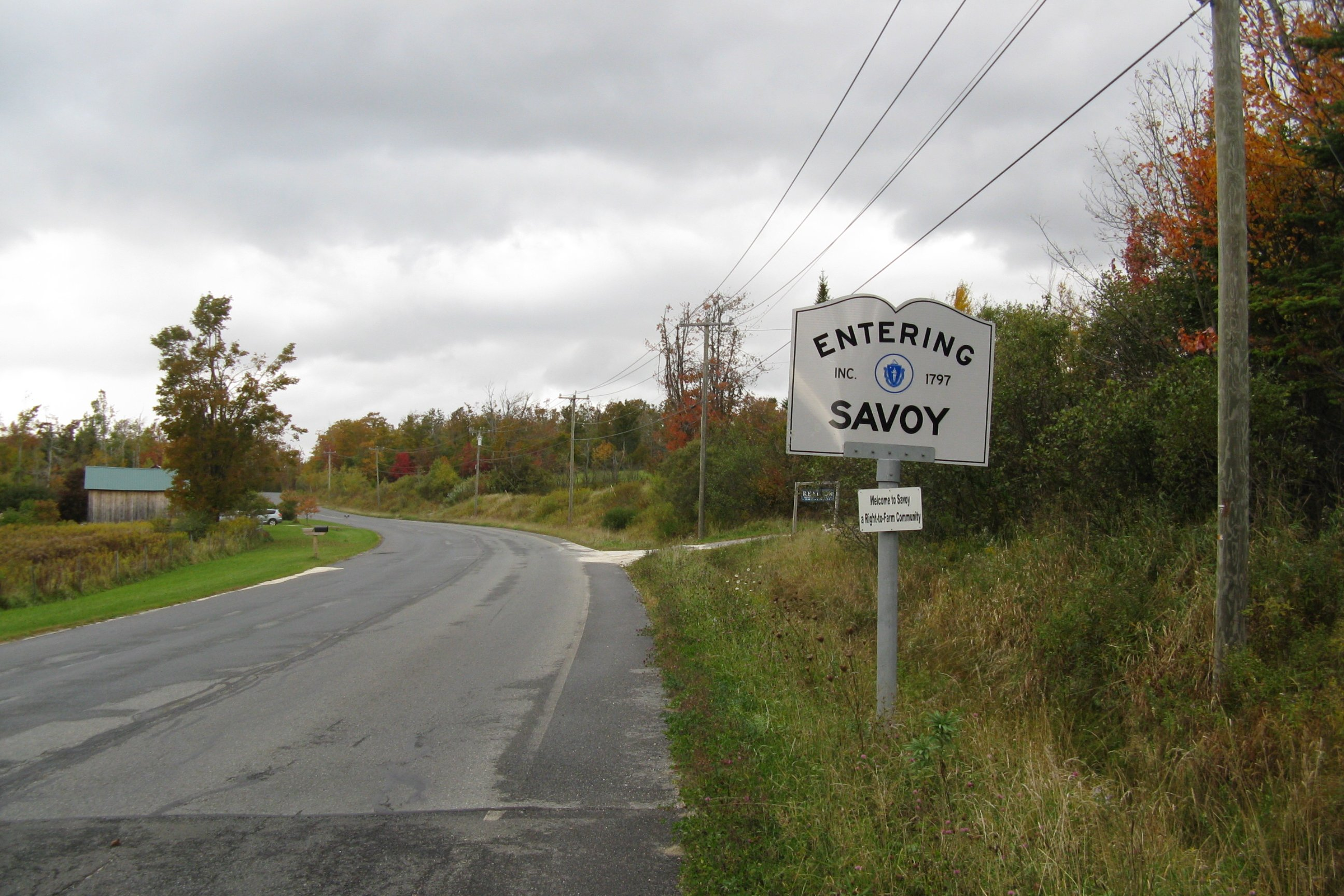
Northbound entering Savoy

8A-L begins at the junction of Route 8 and Route 9 in Dalton. For its first 6.2 miles (10.0 km), Routes 8A & 9 are concurrent, leading into the town of Windsor. There, Route 8A turns northward, passing through part of the Windsor State Forest, before entering the town of Savoy. There, the route turns eastward, becoming concurrent with Route 116. It passes through the town center before crossing into Hampshire County and the town of Plainfield.

In Plainfield, Route 8A turns northward again, leaving Route 116 and entering the Dubuque State Forest and crossing into Franklin County and the town of Hawley. It passes through Hawley along winding roads before entering the town of Charlemont. The road turns eastward, running along the south banks of the Deerfield River for a mile before crossing the river to begin is third and final concurrency, this time with Route 2 along the Mohawk Trail. After just 0.6 miles (0.97 km), the route turns northward again, winding into the town of Heath. It passes through the villages of the Dell and North Hawley before finally ending at the Vermont state line, entering the town of Whitingham as Vermont Route 8A, which shortly links to Vermont Route 112.

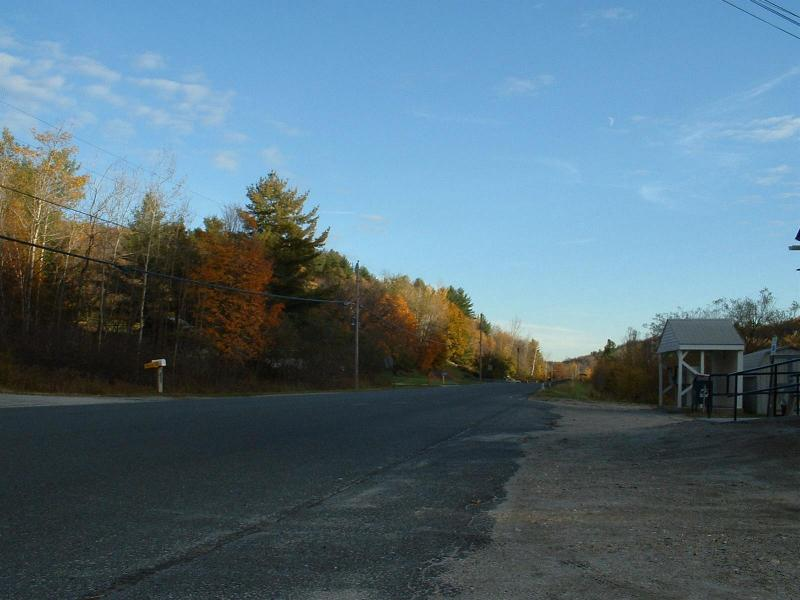
Routes 8A & 116 in Savoy

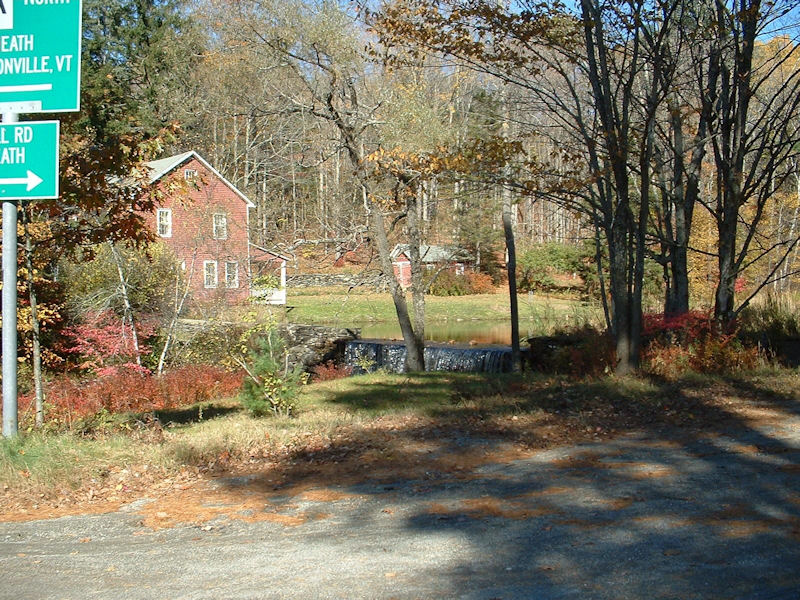
Route 8A passes a dam along the Heath Brook in the Dell village of Heath

=== Major intersections ===
County	Location	mi	km	Destinations	Notes
Berkshire	Dalton	0.00	0.00	Route 8 / Route 9 west – Pittsfield, Adams, Hinsdale, Becket	Southern terminus; southern end of Route 9 concurrency
Berkshire	Windsor	6.20	9.98	Route 9 east – Cummington, Northampton	Northern end of Route 9 concurrency
Berkshire	Savoy	10.60	17.06	Route 116 north – Adams	Southern end of Route 116 concurrency
Hampshire	Plainfield	16.3	26.2	Route 116 south – Plainfield, Ashfield	Northern end of Route 116 concurrency
Franklin	Charlemont	25.8	41.5	Route 2 west – North Adams	Southern end of Route 2 concurrency
Franklin	Charlemont	26.4	42.5	Route 2 east – Greenfield	Northern end of Route 2 concurrency
Franklin	Heath	35.84	57.68	VT 8A north to VT 112 – Jacksonville	Continuation into Vermont
1.000 mi = 1.609 km; 1.000 km = 0.621 mi: Concurrency terminus

== Route 8A-U ==
=== Route description ===
8A-U runs along former Route 8, entirely within the city of North Adams. It begins at a jughandle intersection with Route 8 south of town, briefly heading east before traveling north for 3.17 miles (5.10 km) It closely parallels its parent along this stretch, before entering the downtown area and ending at the Route 2/Route 8 concurrency.

=== Major intersections ===
The entire route is in North Adams, Berkshire County.

mi	km	Destinations	Notes
0.00	0.00	Route 8 – Adams, Pittsfield, North Adams	Southern terminus
3.17	5.10	Route 2 / Route 8 – Williamstown, Adams, Clarksburg, Greenfield	Northern terminus
1.000 mi = 1.609 km; 1.000 km = 0.621 mi
