= Vermont Route 112 =

State highway in Windham County, Vermont, US

Vermont Route 112
- VT 112 highlighted in red

Route information
- Maintained by VTrans
- Length: 7.450 mi (11.990 km)

Major junctions
- South end: Route 112 at Colrain, MA
- North end: VT 100 in Jacksonville

Location
- Country: United States
- State: Vermont
- Counties: Windham

Highway system
- State highways in Vermont
← VT 111	→ VT 113
← VT 129	→ VT 131

Vermont Route 112 (VT 112) is a short 7.450-mile-long (11.990 km) state highway in southern Vermont, United States. It is a continuation of Massachusetts Route 112, running from the state line in Halifax north to an intersection with VT 100 in the village of Jacksonville. VT 112 runs in a northwest-southeast trajectory (signed north–south) and is entirely contained within Windham County.

== Route description ==
Vermont Route 112 begins in the south at the Massachusetts state border, where Massachusetts Route 112 crosses from Colrain, Massachusetts into Halifax, Vermont. The highway runs northwest, passing west of Halifax, and crossing into the town of Whitingham, where it meets the northern terminus of town-maintained Vermont Route 8A, itself a short northern extension of Massachusetts Route 8A. Route 112 continues to the northwest, passing directly into the village of Jacksonville, where it ends at an intersection with Route 100.

== Major intersections ==
The entire route is in Windham County.

Location	mi	km	Destinations	Notes
Halifax	0.000	0.000	Route 112 south – Greenfield	Continuation from Massachusetts
Whitingham	5.907	9.506	VT 8A south – Charlemont MA	Northern terminus of VT 8A
Whitingham	7.450	11.990	VT 100 – Whitingham, Readsboro, Wilmington	Northern terminus; Village of Jacksonville
1.000 mi = 1.609 km; 1.000 km = 0.621 mi
