= Notchview =

Property in Massachusetts

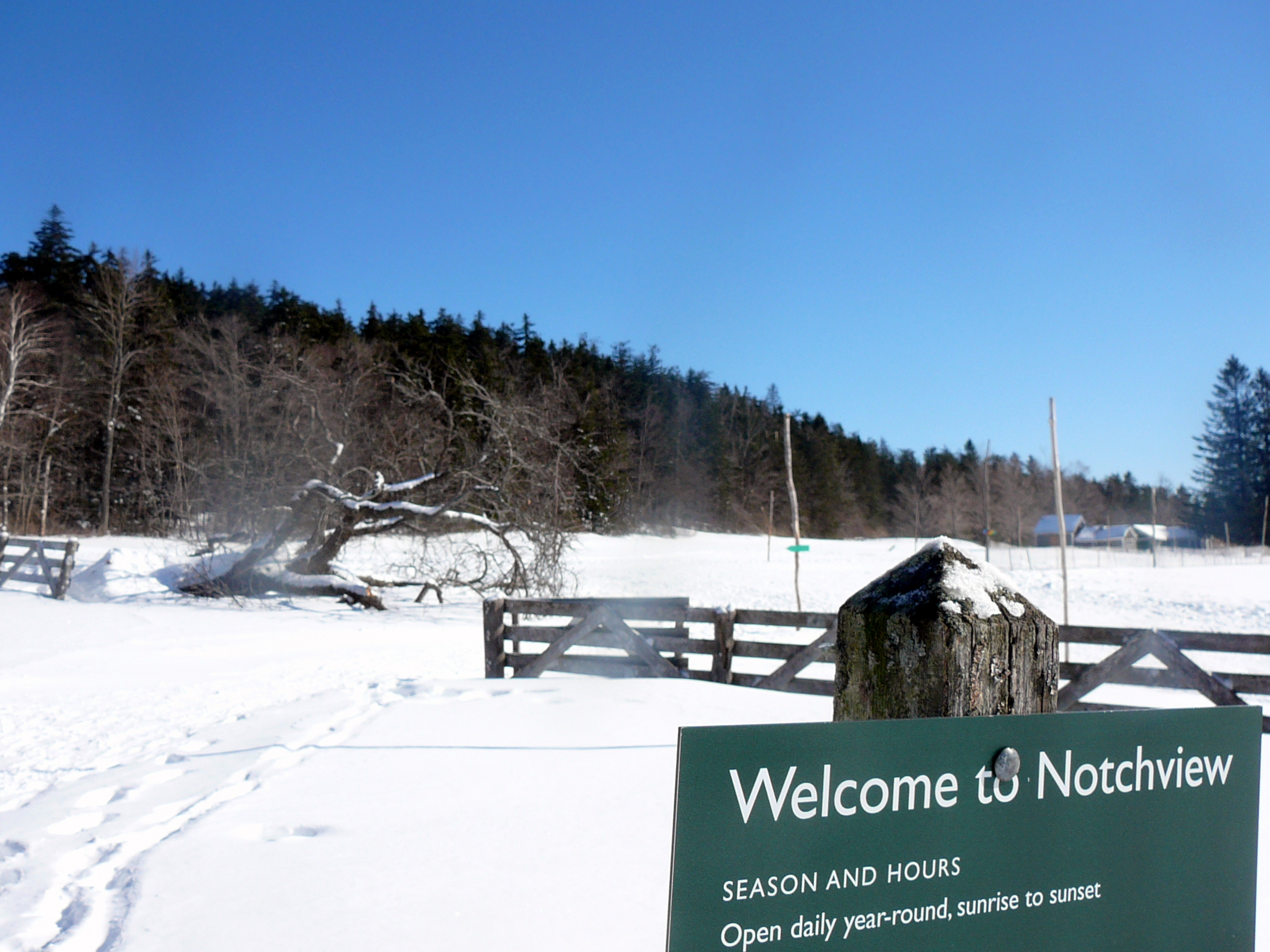
- Interactive map of Notchview
- Location: Windsor, Massachusetts
- Coordinates: 42°30′19″N 73°2′12″W
- Area: 12.57 km^{2} (4.85 sq mi)
- Elevation: 609 m (1,998 ft)
- Established: 1965
- Operator: The Trustees of Reservations
- Website: Notchview

Notchview is a 3,100-acre (13 km^{2}) conservation property located on Massachusetts Route 9 in Windsor, Massachusetts in eastern Berkshire County, Massachusetts, United States. It is owned and managed by the Trustees of Reservations.

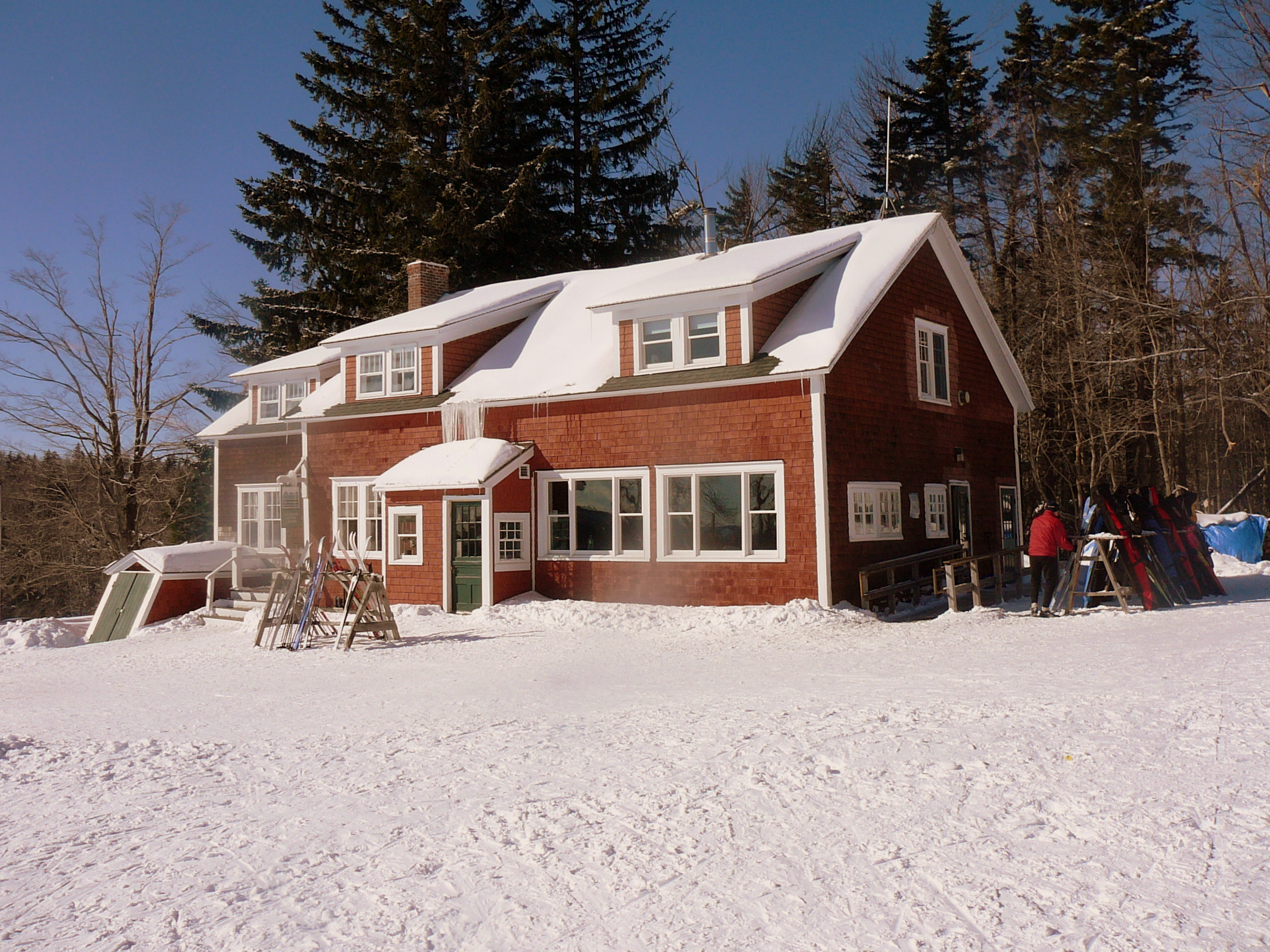
Visitor Center at Notchview

== History ==
Early 19th century farmers made attempts to cultivate the region, but rocky soils and a short growing season soon forced them to farm elsewhere. By the year 1900, these farms were bought up and became larger private estates. Lt. Col. Arthur D. Budd merged these holdings into the 3,000-acre (12 km^{2}) Notch View Farm, which he bequeathed to The Trustees of Reservations in 1965. In 1993, an additional 93 acres (380,000 m^{2}) from the Smithers Woodland Preserve were added to the reservation.

== Land ==
Notchview is a part of the Hoosac Range, part of Vermont's Green Mountains. Judges Hill is the highest point on the reservation at 2,297 feet (700 m). At the summit is Judges Fort, a stonework patio where a group of friends, some of whom were judges, used to meet for picnics. With the exception of some southerly facing fields, most of the Reservation is covered with a red spruce and northern hardwood forest. Areas with poor drainage contain a spruce and fir tree mix that lends a Boreal forest appearance.

== Recreation ==
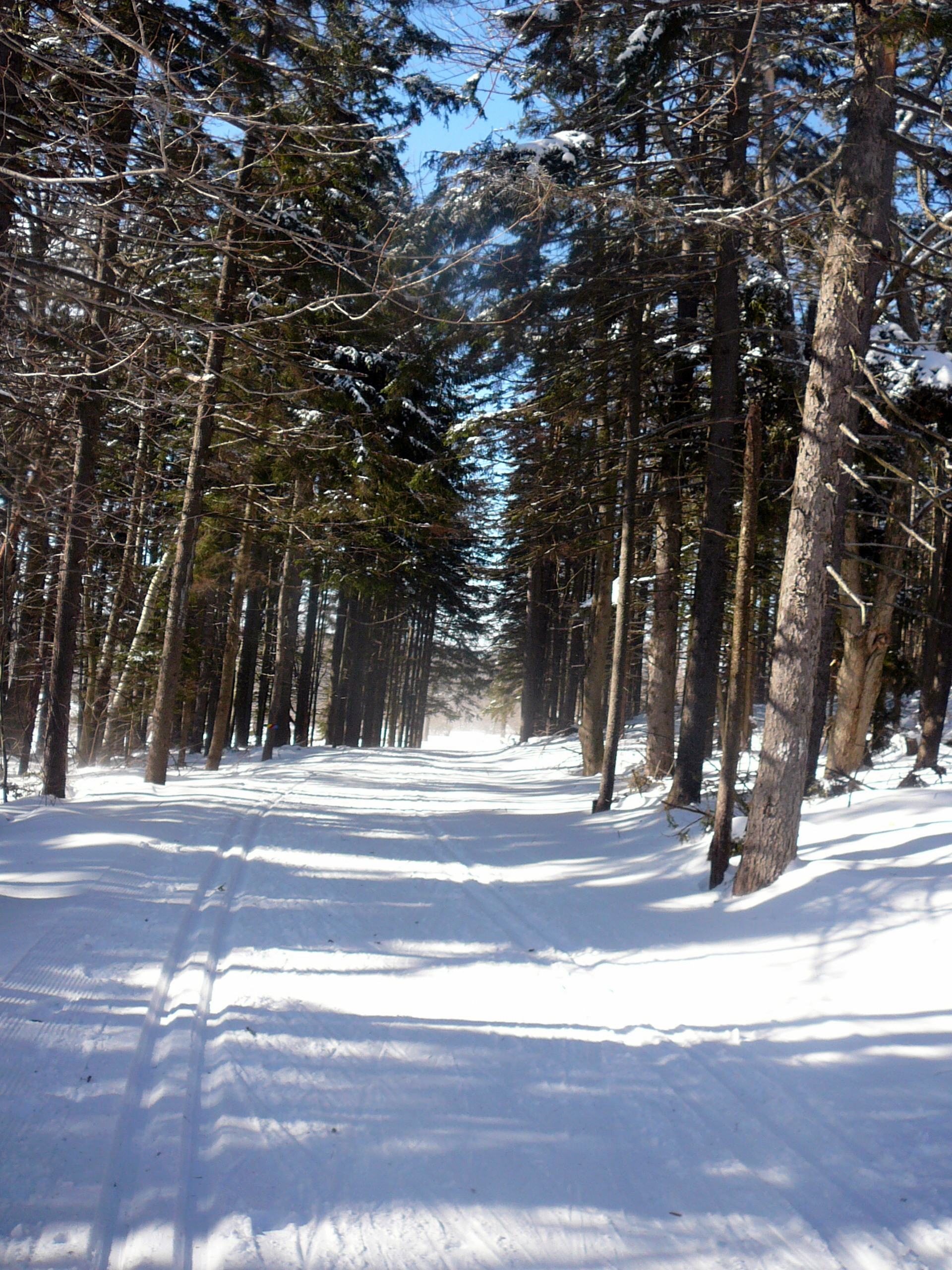
Circuit Trail at Notchview

Under management of the Trustees of Reservations, during the winter months Notchview is now a primary Nordic Skiing center, with a 40-kilometer trail system (25 km groomed) for classic and (12 km) for skating. There are 11 km of beginner trails, 18 km intermediate, and 11.2 advanced. Snowshoeing is also allowed on the property, with 3.7 km of trail dedicated to this sport. Notchview is one of the locations of the Bill Koch Youth Ski League, the youth division of NENSA. Notchview was the host of the Bill Koch League Festival in 2001, 2005, and 2009, in partnership with TD Banknorth. Notchview is open year-round, with summer and autumn activities of hiking and bird-watching. A ski lodge and office accommodates skiers, with hot drinks and restrooms available. Nordic ski rentals are available by the day. Small 3-walled shelters have been constructed in some of the fields as picnic locations or to provide a wind barrier for resting skiers.
