= Whitingham Village Historic District =

Historic district in Vermont, United States

- U.S. National Register of Historic Places
- U.S. Historic district
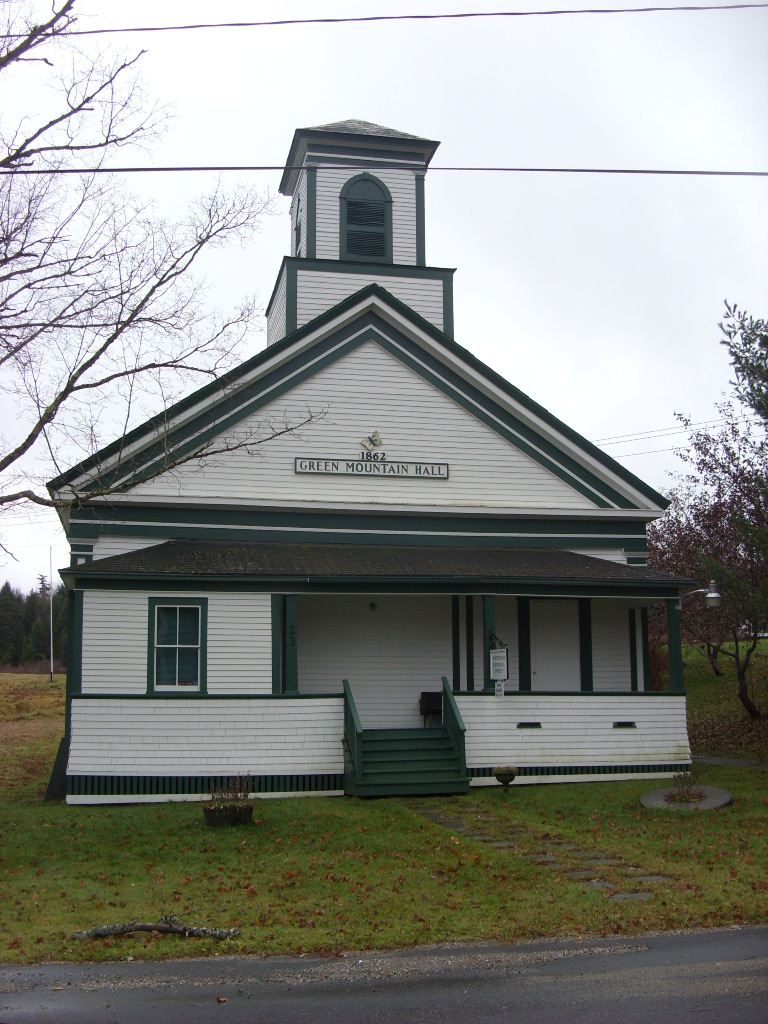
- Green Mountain Hall

- Location within Vermont Location within the United States
- Location: VT 100, School St., Brook St., and Stimpson Hill Rd., Whitingham, Vermont
- Coordinates: 42°47′25″N 72°52′49″W
- Area: 55 acres (22 ha)
- Built: 1860
- Architectural style: Federal, Greek Revival
- NRHP reference No.: 06000140
- Added to NRHP: March 15, 2006

The Whitingham Village Historic District encompasses much of the current village center of Whitingham, Vermont. It was developed mainly in the second half of the 19th century around industries powered by local water sources, and includes well-preserved architecture from that period. It was listed on the National Register of Historic Places in 2006.

== Description and history ==
The present village of Whitingham was established in 1822, when a mineral spring with supposed healing properties was found in the area. Sadawga Brook, which feeds the Deerfield River via Harriman Reservoir, drops substantially after leaving Sadawga Lake, and provided a source of water power for industries. By 1840 the village included a gristmill, sawmill, and wood turning shop, along with a small cluster of homes. This economic growth led to the village's increasing importance, resulting in the movement of the town's civic center there from a nearby hill in the 1860s. The village began to decline economically in the early decades of the 20th century, and the sites of some of its mills were flooded by the construction of Harriman Dam in 1924, while others succumbed to fire.

The historic village center is stretched along Vermont Route 100, roughly between Sadawga Lake Road and Brook Street, and extends north along School Street almost to Maple Drive. A few properties on Brook Street and Stimpson Hill Road that lie adjacent to these are also included. Most of the buildings in the district are residential wood frame structures, in vernacular interpretations of the Greek Revival and Gothic Revival. Other buildings of note are the Greek Revival Whitingham Community Church (1862), Green Mountain Hall (formerly the c. 1860 Universalist Church, also Greek Revival), and the c. 1870 Number Nine Schoolhouse.

== See also ==
- National Register of Historic Places listings in Windham County, Vermont
