= Vermont Route 8A =

State highway in Windham County, Vermont, US

Vermont Route 8A
- VT 8A highlighted in red

Route information
- Maintained by the Town of Whitingham
- Length: 3.300 mi (5.311 km)

Major junctions
- South end: Route 8A in Heath, MA
- North end: VT 112 in Whitingham

Location
- Country: United States
- State: Vermont
- Counties: Windham

Highway system
- State highways in Vermont
← VT 8	→ VT 9

Vermont Route 8A (VT 8A) is a 3.300-mile-long (5.311 km) state highway in Windham County, Vermont, United States. It is the northward continuation of Massachusetts' Route 8A, running entirely in the town of Whitingham. The road is numbered as a state route but is maintained by the town of Whitingham as a class 2 town highway. For this reason, it is signed with a black and white circular shield.

VT 8A is an extension of Massachusetts Route 8A and is unrelated to VT 8.

== Route description ==
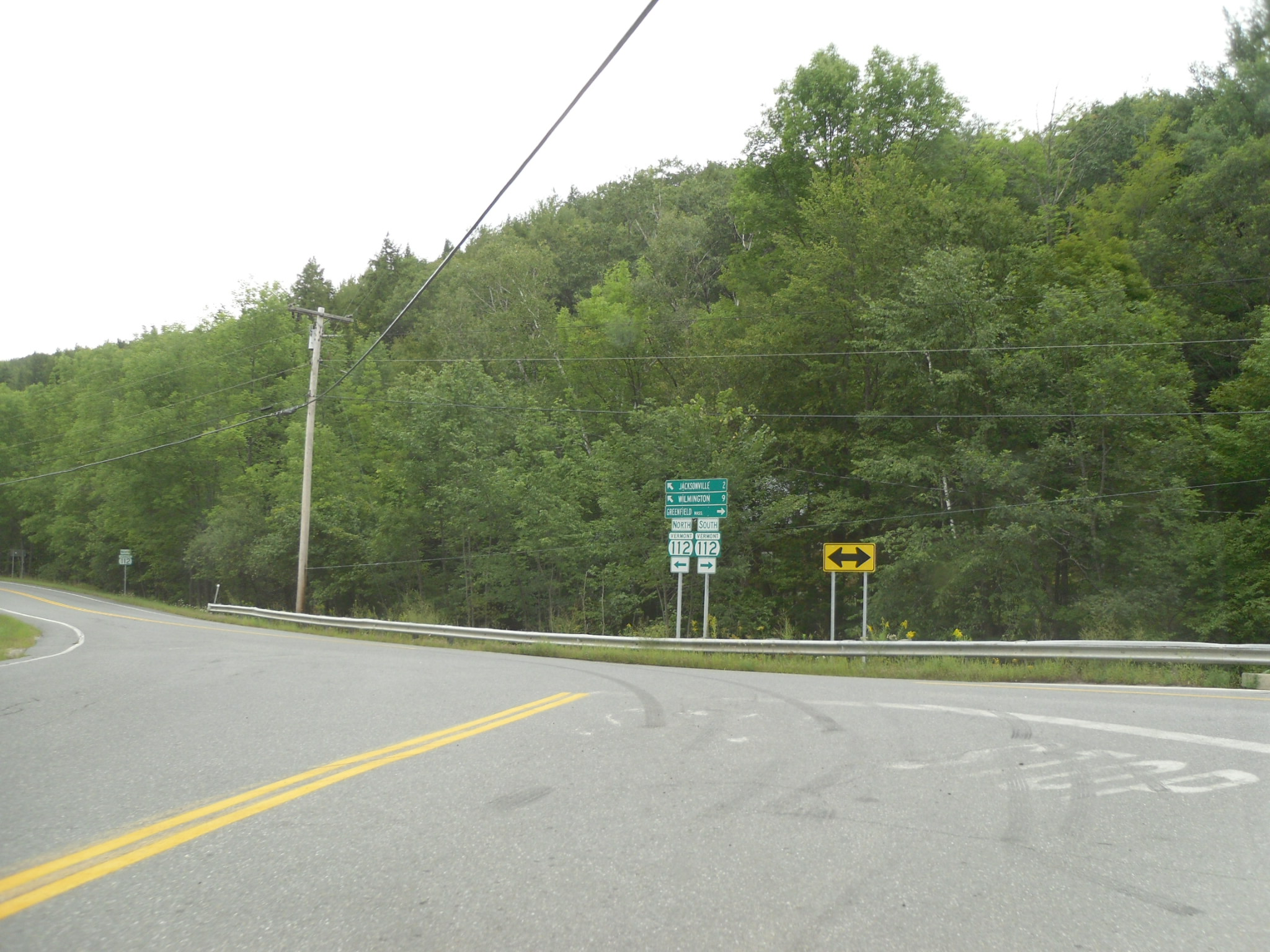
VT 8A at the junction with VT 112 in Halifax

VT 8A begins at the Massachusetts–Vermont state line as a northern continuation of Route 8A-L in the town of Whitingham. VT 8A runs north as a two-lane rural highway, crossing through Whitingham, soon gaining the moniker of Stage Road near the junction of McMillan Road. After a short northwestern jog, the route turns north at Burrington Hill Road, passing the rural Fire Fox Road, and turning northeast along the valley. The route soon bends north again, paralleling the East Branch of the North River, entering the town of Halifax. After the town line, VT 8A reaches a junction with VT 112, which runs north to the community of Jacksonville and south to the Massachusetts state line and Route 112.

== Major intersections ==
The entire route is in Whitingham, Windham County.

mi	km	Destinations	Notes
0.000	0.000	Route 8A south – Charlemont	Continuation into Massachusetts
3.300	5.311	VT 112 – Jacksonville, Wilmington, Greenfield MA	Northern terminus
1.000 mi = 1.609 km; 1.000 km = 0.621 mi
