= Cheshire (CDP), Massachusetts =

Cheshire, Massachusetts
- Census-designated place
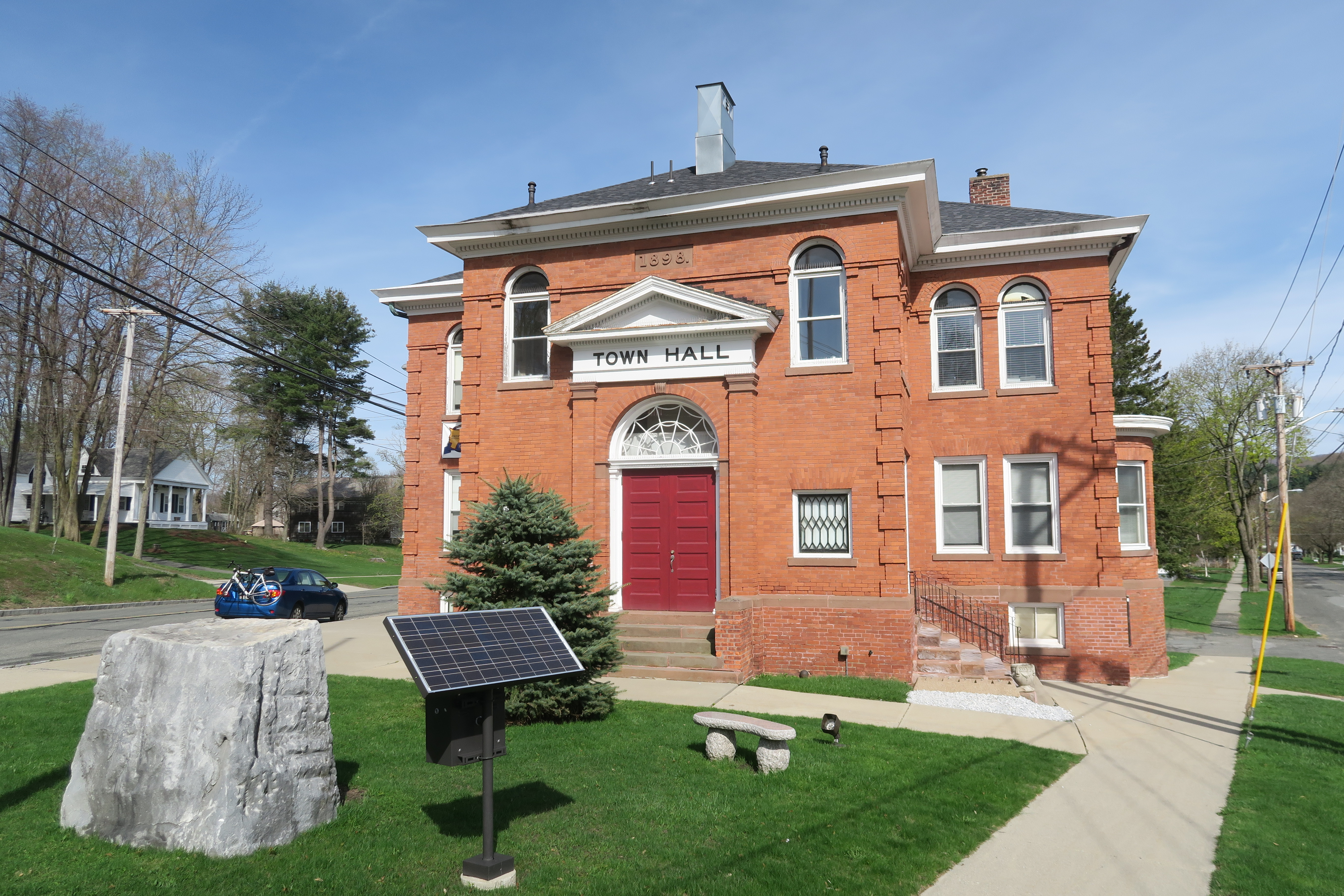
- Town Hall

- Location in Berkshire County and the state of Massachusetts.
- Coordinates: 42°33′43″N 73°9′46″W
- Country: United States
- State: Massachusetts
- County: Berkshire
- Town: Cheshire

Area
  - Total: 0.38 sq mi (0.99 km^{2})
  - Land: 0.38 sq mi (0.99 km^{2})
  - Water: 0 sq mi (0.00 km^{2})
- Elevation: 994 ft (303 m)

Population (2020)
  - Total: 545
  - Density: 1,420.9/sq mi (548.62/km^{2})
- Time zone: UTC-5 (Eastern (EST))
  - Summer (DST): UTC-4 (EDT)
- ZIP code: 01225
- Area code: 413
- FIPS code: 25-13310
- GNIS feature ID: 0607347

Cheshire is a census-designated place (CDP) located in the town of Cheshire in Berkshire County, Massachusetts, United States. The population was 514 at the 2010 census, out of 3,235 in the entire town of Cheshire.

== Geography ==
Cheshire CDP is located in the center of the town of Cheshire at 42°33′43″N 73°9′46″W. Massachusetts Route 8 passes through the center of the community, leading north to Adams and North Adams and south towards Pittsfield. The CDP sits at the head of the Hoosic River, where it flows out of the Cheshire Reservoir.

According to the United States Census Bureau, the Cheshire CDP has a total area of 0.39 square miles (1.0 km^{2}), all land.

== Demographics ==
Historical population
Census	Pop.	Note	%±
2020	545		—
U.S. Decennial Census
