= Whitingham (CDP), Vermont =

Census-designated place in Vermont, United States

Whitingham, Vermont
- Census-designated place
- Location within Vermont Location within the United States
- Coordinates: 42°47′21″N 72°53′01″W
- Country: United States
- State: Vermont
- County: Windham
- Town: Whitingham

Area
  - Total: 0.16 sq mi (0.42 km^{2})
  - Land: 0.16 sq mi (0.42 km^{2})
  - Water: 0 sq mi (0.0 km^{2})
- Elevation: 1,637 ft (499 m)

Population (2020)
  - Total: 91
- Time zone: UTC-5 (Eastern (EST))
  - Summer (DST): UTC-4 (EDT)
- ZIP Code: 05361
- Area code: 802
- FIPS code: 50-83875
- GNIS feature ID: 2807169

Whitingham is the central village and a census-designated place (CDP) in the town of Whitingham, Windham County, Vermont, United States. As of the 2020 census, it had a population of 91, compared to 1,344 in the entire town. Part of the village comprises the Whitingham Village Historic District.

== Geography ==
The CDP is in southwestern Windham County, west of the geographic center of the town of Whitingham. The community sits on a hill rising to the east above the south end of the Harriman Reservoir, an impoundment on the Deerfield River, which flows south and east to the Connecticut River in Massachusetts.

Vermont Route 100 passes through the village, leading east 3.5 miles (5.6 km) to Jacksonville, the largest community in the town of Whitingham, and west 5 miles (8 km) to Readsboro.
