= Karen Hein =

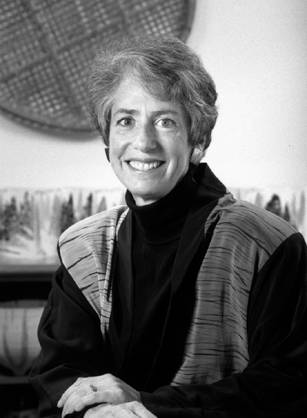
Dr. Karen Hein

Dr. Karen Hein is a pediatrician and health policy expert who founded the first comprehensive HIV/AIDS program (research, clinical care and advocacy) for adolescents in the world.

== Early life ==
Karen Hein was born in 1944 in New York City. Her father was a physician. Her mother also showed great interest in medicine, auditing classes at Karen's father's medical school and volunteering in his genetics lab, while at the same time caring for the couple's four children. Karen later said that she became a physician "because my mother couldn't".

== Education ==
Dr. Hein earned her bachelor's degree from the University of Wisconsin in 1966. She first entered medical school at Dartmouth Medical School in 1966 and attended there from 1966 to 1968. She then transferred to Columbia University College of Physicians and Surgeons where she graduated with an M.D. in 1970.

== Career ==
After graduating from medical school, Dr. Hein completed a fellowship in adolescent medicine at Montefiore Hospital. Her first job out of fellowship was at the Spofford Juvenile Center, treating adolescent patients in trouble with the law. Subsequently, Dr Hein went on to a series of senior leadership positions in The Federal Government (Professional Staff of The US Senate Finance Committee, philanthropy (as President, William T Grant Foundation, ‘think tank’ (as Executive Officer, The Institute of Medicine, now renamed The National Academy of Medicine) as well as serving on the Advisory Boards of many not-for-profit organizations including The RAND Corp's Health Advisory Board, The IRC, ChildFund International and CUSON Advisory Boards.

== Publications ==
Dr. Hein has published nearly 150 books, articles, and abstracts over the course of her career. Some of her notable publications include:

- AIDS in Adolescence: A Rationale for Concern, 1987
- AIDS: Trading Fears for Facts, A Guide for Teens, 1989
- "Aligning Science with Politics and Policy in HIV Prevention"

== Activism ==
In her own words, she became a physician to "be an agent of change in society by helping to improve the system related to health of the people in this country and around the world." Her activism began as a student working with the Student Health Organization, where she helped care for abandoned babies at Lincoln Hospital in the South Bronx.

=== HIV/AIDS Activism ===
Dr. Hein's background in adolescent medicine gave her a unique perspective on the growing AIDS epidemic in the 1980s. With the help of her husband, Dr. Ralph Dell, a pediatrician who created a mathematical model to predict that HIV would become present in the adolescent population, Dr. Hein authored a paper, "AIDS in Adolescents: A Rationale for Concern", for which she was awarded a $1 million grant from the Centers for Disease Control.

With this grant she established the first HIV/AIDS program specifically for adolescents in the world, the Adolescent Risk Reduction Program at Montefiore Hospital. She served there as the program's founding director.

=== Green Mountain Care Board ===
In May 2011, the Vermont legislature passed Act 48, a law that intended "to create a health care system in which all residents receive coverage from a single source, with all coverage offered equitably and health care costs contained by systematic change in the way providers of health care are compensated for their services.” As a result, Dr. Karen Hein was appointed as one of five members of the Green Mountain Care Board, which oversees the health care system of the state of Vermont. In her role on the GMCB, she has also emphasized social, economic, and personal well-being for the citizens of Vermont, promoting healthy school lunches, upkeep of bike paths, and meaningful, safe employment among other causes.

== Later life ==
In 2003, Dr. Hein and her husband, Dr. Ralph Dell, moved to Whitingham, Vermont, where they have owned a home for several decades. Together they have fulfilled a childhood dream of Karen's to live in Vermont among the trees. There, Karen raises cashmere goats. She weaves and knits with cashmere wool from her flock each morning.
