= Windsor State Forest =

Protected area in Massachusetts, United States

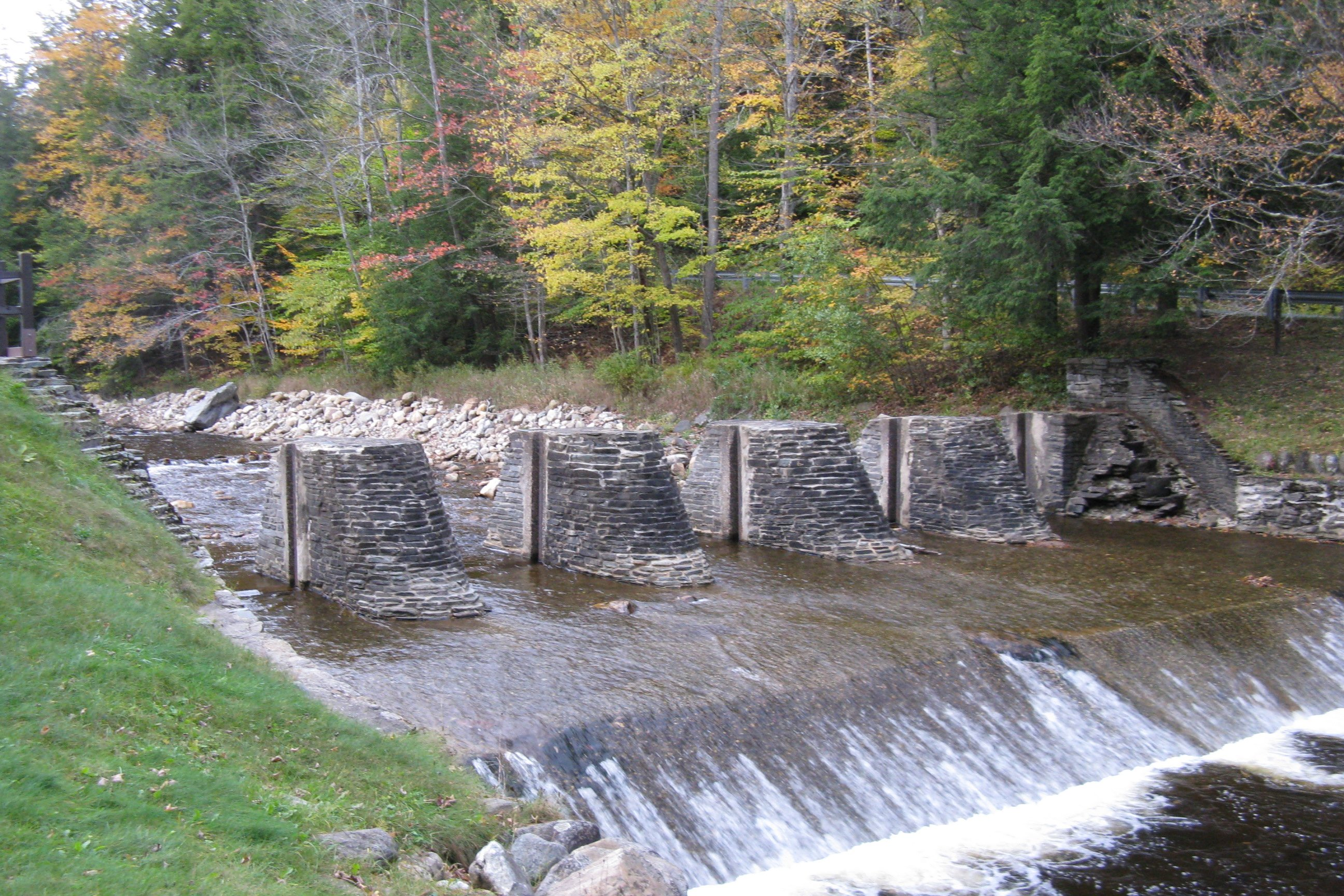
- Windsor Dam built by the Civilian Conservation Corps

- Location within Massachusetts Location within the United States
- Location: Windsor, Massachusetts, United States
- Coordinates: 42°31′20″N 72°59′33″W
- Area: 1,824 acres (7.38 km^{2})
- Elevation: 1,476 ft (450 m)
- Established: 1925
- Administrator: Massachusetts Department of Conservation and Recreation
- Website: Official website

Windsor State Forest is a state forest in the town of Windsor in northwest Massachusetts. Managed by the Massachusetts Department of Conservation and Recreation, the forest is noted for the Windsor Jambs waterfall, which cascades through a 25-foot-wide (7.6 m) gorge between 80-foot-high (24 m) granite walls. Trails are available for hiking, mountain biking, horseback riding, and cross-country skiing.
