= Windsor, Massachusetts =

- Town
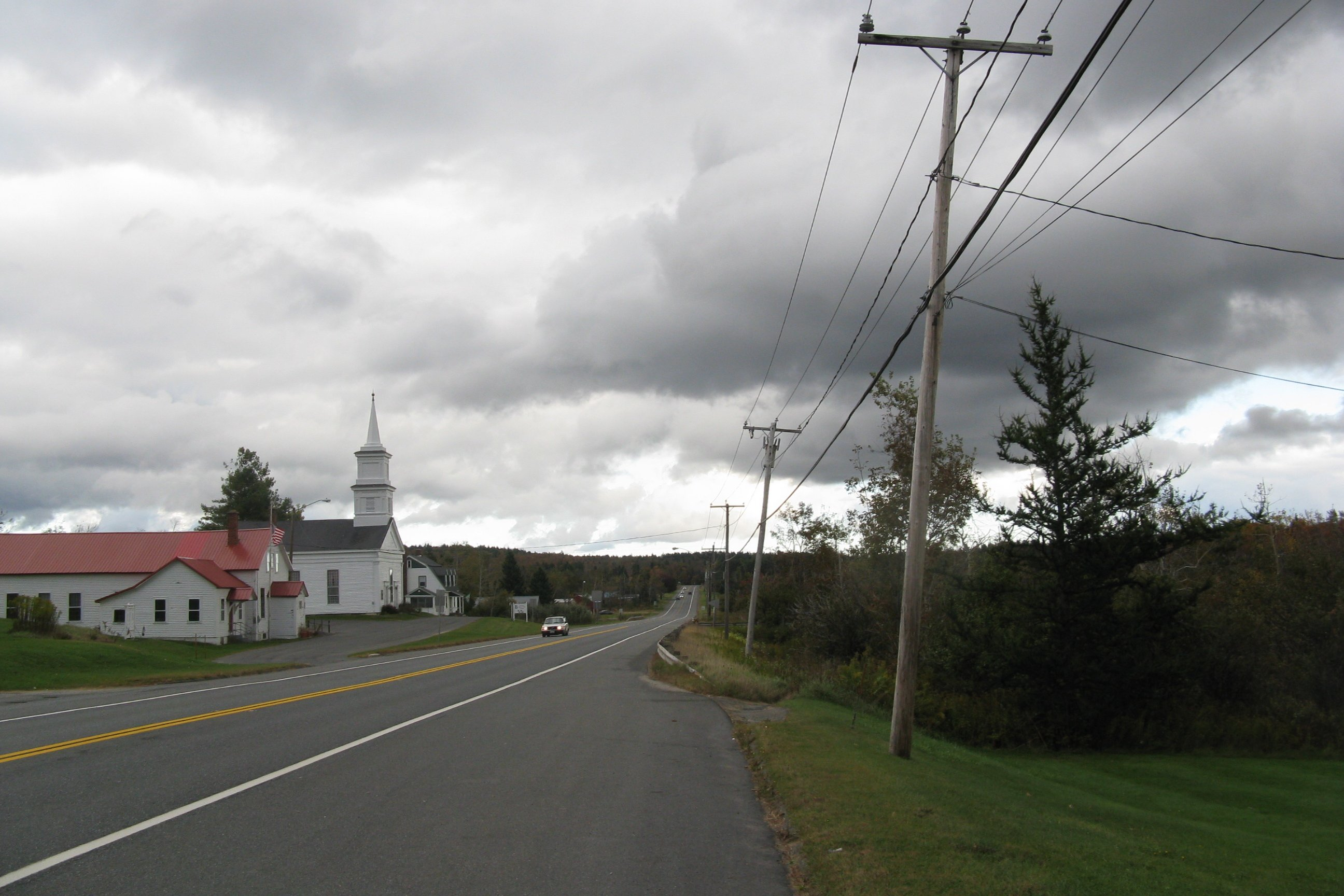
- Massachusetts Route 9 in Windsor in 2009

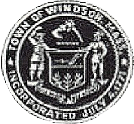
- Seal

- Location in Berkshire County and the state of Massachusetts.
- Coordinates: 42°30′42″N 73°03′30″W
- Country: United States
- State: Massachusetts
- County: Berkshire
- Settled: 1767
- Incorporated: 1771

Government
  - Type: Open town meeting

Area
  - Total: 35.2 sq mi (91.1 km^{2})
  - Land: 35.0 sq mi (90.6 km^{2})
  - Water: 0.15 sq mi (0.4 km^{2})
- Elevation: 2,031 ft (619 m)

Population (2020)
  - Total: 899
  - Density: 25.7/sq mi (9.92/km^{2})
- Time zone: UTC-5 (Eastern)
  - Summer (DST): UTC-4 (Eastern)
- ZIP Codes: 01270 (Windsor); 01026 (Cummington)
- Area code: 413
- FIPS code: 25-80685
- GNIS feature ID: 0619431
- Website: windsormass.com

Windsor is a town in Berkshire County, Massachusetts, United States. It is part of the Metropolitan Statistical Area of Pittsfield, Massachusetts. The population was 831 at the 2020 census.

== History ==
Windsor was first settled in 1767 and was officially incorporated in 1771. The town was named for Windsor, Connecticut, where many of the settlers emigrated from. Originally, the town was named "Gageborough" in honor of British General Thomas Gage, but was changed due to the general's Revolutionary War affiliation.

== Geography ==
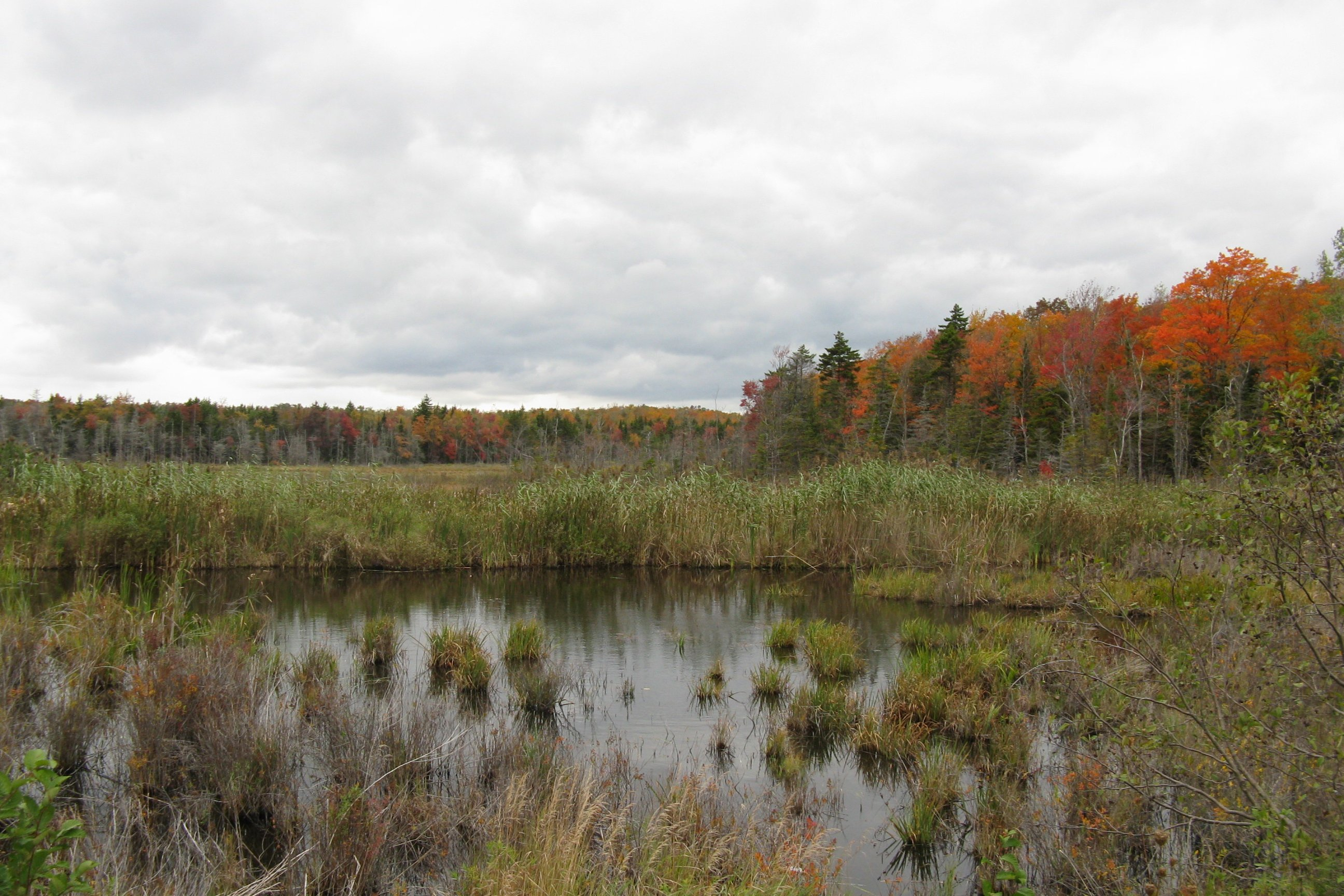
Eugene Moran Wildlife Management Area

According to the United States Census Bureau, the town has a total area of 35.2 square miles (91.1 km^{2}), of which 35.0 square miles (90.6 km^{2}) is land and 0.15 square miles (0.4 km^{2}), or 0.49%, is water. Windsor is mostly rectangular-shaped, and lies along the eastern border of Berkshire County with Hampshire County. It is bordered by Savoy to the north, Plainfield to the northeast and east, Cummington to the southeast, Peru and Hinsdale to the south, Dalton to the southwest, and Cheshire to the northwest. Windsor is 12 miles (19 km) northeast of Pittsfield, 45 miles (72 km) northwest of Springfield, and 120 miles (190 km) west-northwest of Boston.

Windsor is located on a plateau in the Berkshire Hills, and lies near the source of the Westfield River. The river runs southward through the northeastern part of town, flowing through Windsor State Forest. One of the river's feeder brooks flows through the Windsor Jambs, a series of rocky waterfalls. The town is dotted with wildlife management areas, including all of Eugene Moran Wildlife Management Area, as well as portions of the Chalet, Peru and Savoy Wildlife Management Areas.

Windsor is located at the junction of Massachusetts Route 9 and Route 8A, with the two running concurrently west from the junction. Near the northeast corner of town, Route 8A grazes the border (at which point it is combined with Route 116), with a small neighborhood lying around Windsor Pond.

The town has no bus or rail service, with the nearest access to both being in Pittsfield. The Pittsfield Municipal Airport is the nearest regional airport, and the town is located roughly equidistantly between Albany International Airport and Bradley International Airport, the two nearest airports with national service.

== Demographics ==
Historical population
Year	Pop.	±%
1790	916	—
1850	897	−2.1%
1860	839	−6.5%
1870	686	−18.2%
1880	644	−6.1%
1890	612	−5.0%
1900	507	−17.2%
1910	404	−20.3%
1920	403	−0.2%
1930	387	−4.0%
1940	314	−18.9%
1950	372	+18.5%
1960	384	+3.2%
1970	468	+21.9%
1980	598	+27.8%
1990	770	+28.8%
2000	875	+13.6%
2010	899	+2.7%
2020	834	−7.2%
2022*	818	−1.9%
* = population estimate. Source: United States census records and Population Estimates Program data.

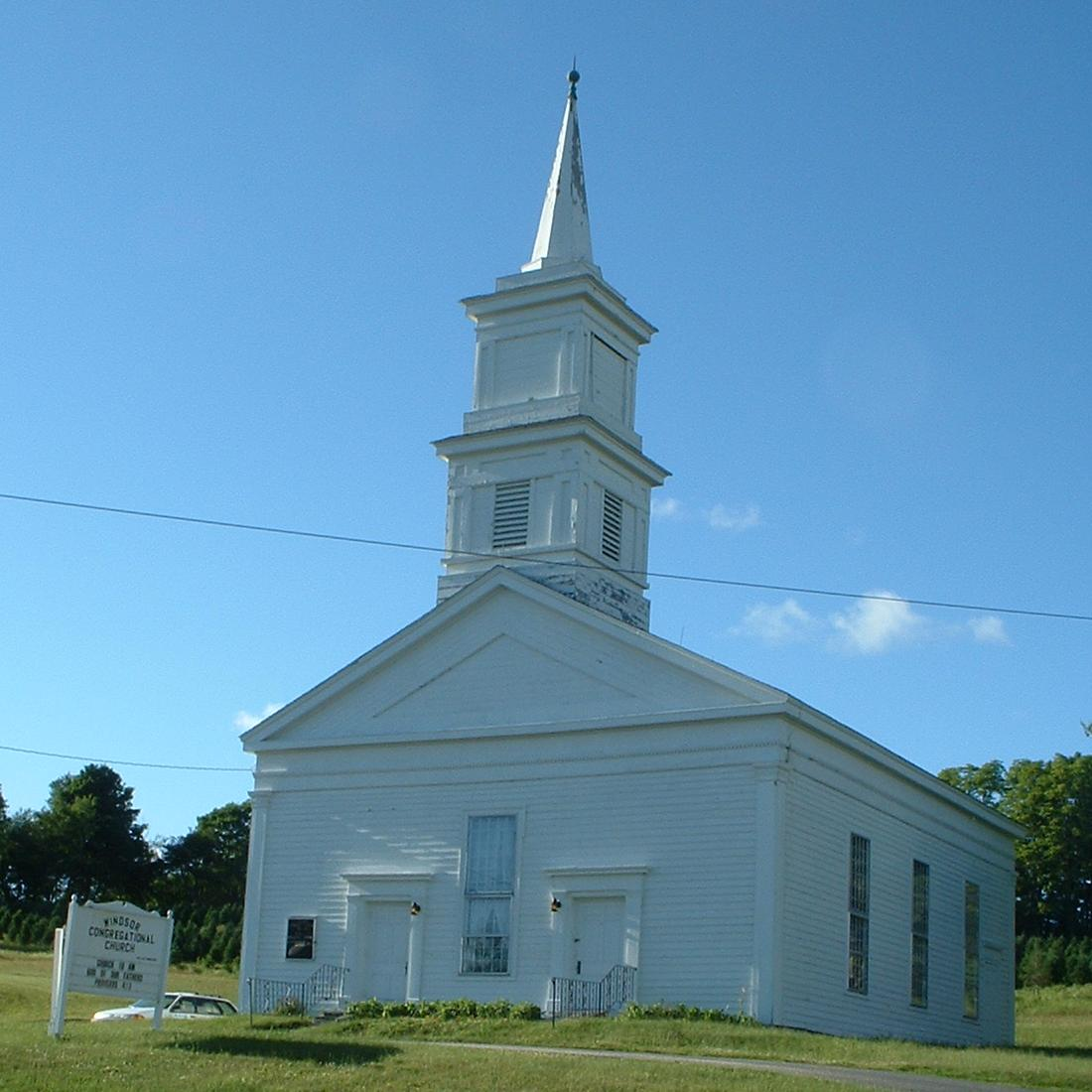
Windsor Congregational Church

As of the census of 2000, there were 875 people, 328 households, and 248 families residing in the town. By population, Windsor ranks 22nd out of the 32 cities and towns in Berkshire County, and 329th out of 351 cities and towns in Massachusetts. The population density was 25.0 people per square mile (9.7/km^{2}), and ranks 25th in the county and 334th in the commonwealth. There were 474 housing units at an average density of 13.5 per square mile (5.2/km^{2}). The racial makeup of the town was 98.86% White, 0.34% from other races, and 0.80% from two or more races. Hispanic or Latino of any race were 0.11% of the population.

There were 328 households, out of which 35.1% had children under the age of 18 living with them, 67.7% were married couples living together, 5.5% had a female householder with no husband present, and 24.1% were non-families. 19.2% of all households were made up of individuals, and 7.6% had someone living alone who was 65 years of age or older. The average household size was 2.67 and the average family size was 3.05.

In the town, the population was spread out, with 26.6% under the age of 18, 4.2% from 18 to 24, 26.6% from 25 to 44, 32.2% from 45 to 64, and 10.3% who were 65 years of age or older. The median age was 41 years. For every 100 females, there were 101.6 males. For every 100 females age 18 and over, there were 98.1 males.

The median income for a household in the town was $51,389, and the median income for a family was $57,500. Males had a median income of $41,053 versus $24,808 for females. The per capita income for the town was $21,794. About 4.3% of families and 5.1% of the population were below the poverty line, including 6.4% of those under age 18 and 1.2% of those age 65 or over.

== Government ==
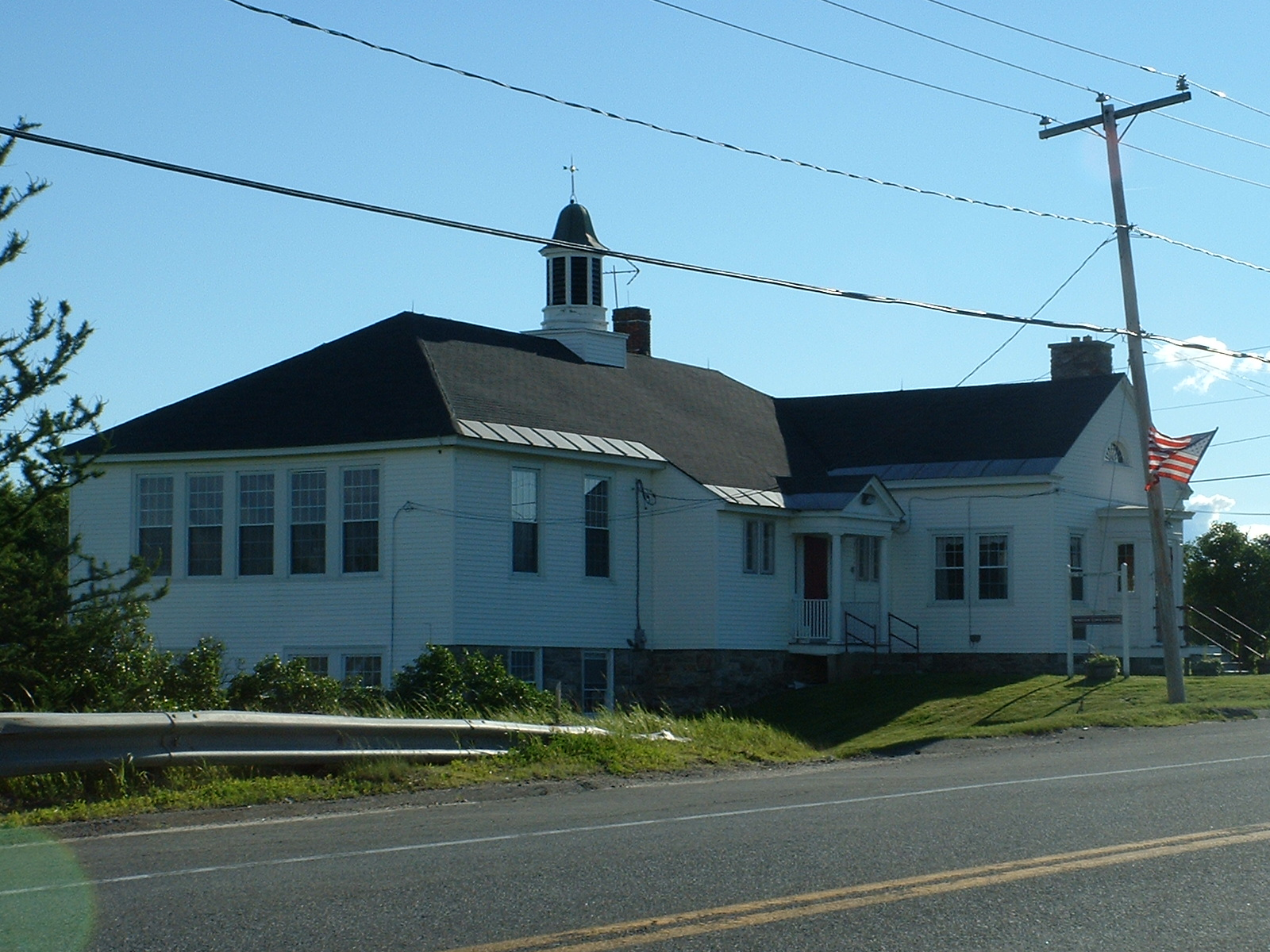
Windsor Free Public Library

Windsor employs the open town meeting form of government, and is led by a board of selectmen. The town has its own services, including police, fire and public works departments. The town's public library is located adjacent to the town hall, and is connected to the regional library system. The nearest hospital, Berkshire Medical Center, is located in Pittsfield.

On the state level, Windsor is represented in the Massachusetts House of Representatives as part of the Second Berkshire district, represented by Paul Mark, which covers central Berkshire County, as well as portions of Hampshire and Franklin counties. In the Massachusetts Senate, the town is part of the Berkshire, Hampshire and Franklin district, represented by Ben Downing, which includes all of Berkshire County and western Hampshire and Franklin counties. The town is patrolled by the Fourth (Cheshire) Station of Barracks "B" of the Massachusetts State Police.

On the national level, Windsor is represented in the United States House of Representatives as part of Massachusetts's 1st congressional district, and is represented by Richard Neal of Springfield. Massachusetts is currently represented in the United States Senate by senior Senator Elizabeth Warren and junior Senator Ed Markey.

Windsor presidential election results
Year	Democratic	Republican	Third parties	Total Votes	Margin
2020	63.90% 370	34.72% 201	1.38% 8	579	29.19%
2016	60.31% 313	30.64% 159	9.06% 47	519	29.67%
2012	73.33% 385	24.19% 127	2.48% 13	525	49.14%
2008	71.84% 398	25.63% 142	2.53% 14	554	46.21%
2004	67.80% 358	31.25% 165	0.95% 5	528	36.55%
2000	53.76% 243	34.73% 157	11.50% 52	452	19.03%
1996	59.46% 264	21.62% 96	18.92% 84	444	37.84%
1992	48.69% 223	18.34% 84	32.97% 151	458	15.72%
1988	49.49% 194	49.74% 195	0.77% 3	392	0.26%
1984	35.88% 122	63.24% 215	0.88% 3	340	27.35%
1980	35.44% 112	46.20% 146	18.35% 58	316	10.76%
1976	47.47% 141	48.15% 143	4.38% 13	297	0.67%
1972	40.26% 93	59.31% 137	0.43% 1	231	19.05%
1968	34.00% 68	54.50% 109	11.50% 23	200	20.50%
1964	61.18% 104	37.65% 64	1.18% 2	170	23.53%
1960	35.47% 61	64.53% 111	0.00% 0	172	29.07%
1956	25.56% 46	74.44% 134	0.00% 0	180	48.89%
1952	25.00% 39	75.00% 117	0.00% 0	156	50.00%
1948	33.33% 44	65.15% 86	1.52% 2	132	31.82%
1944	31.48% 34	68.52% 74	0.00% 0	108	37.04%
1940	34.90% 52	64.43% 96	0.67% 1	149	29.53%

== Education ==
Windsor is a member town of the Central Berkshire Regional School District. All students in the district attend the Nessacus Regional Middle School for the middle grades, and Wahconah Regional High School for the upper grades. Both schools are located in Dalton. The nearest parochial school is in Dalton, and the nearest private schools are in Pittsfield.

The nearest community college is Berkshire Community College in Pittsfield. The nearest state college is Massachusetts College of Liberal Arts in North Adams, the nearest state university is the University of Massachusetts Amherst, and the nearest private colleges are Williams College in Williamstown and Smith College in Northampton.

== Point of interest ==
- Notchview, a 3,100-acre (13 km^{2}) reservation managed by the Trustees of Reservations, open to cross country skiers along with other forms of outdoor recreation

== Notable people ==
- Alfred E. Bates, U.S. Army major general
- Daniel Sabin Butrick, minister and author
- Stephen Philbrick, minister, author, and poet
