= Adams (CDP), Massachusetts =

Adams, Massachusetts
- Census-designated place
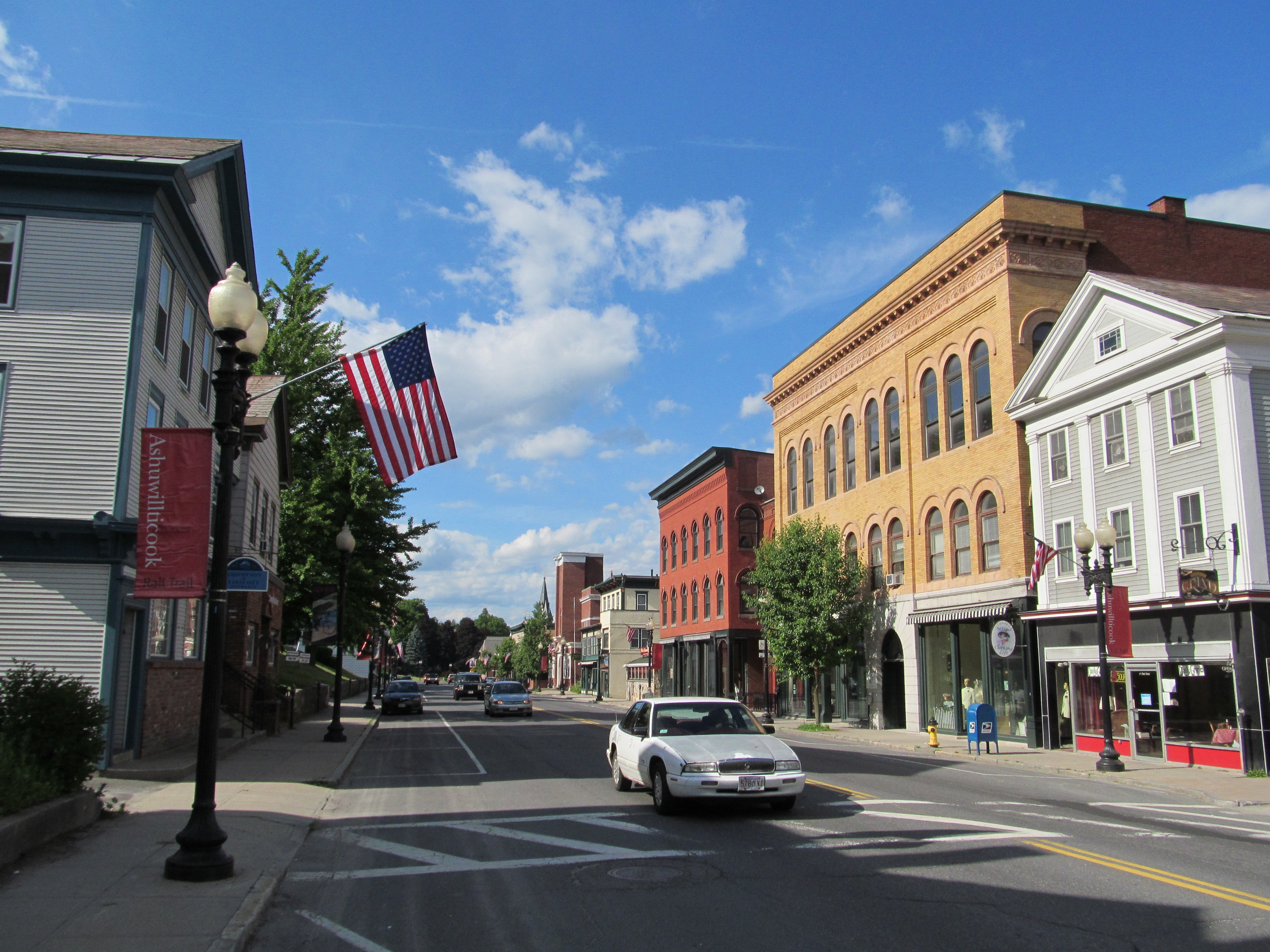
- Park Street

- Location in Berkshire County and the state of Massachusetts.
- Coordinates: 42°37′31″N 73°7′6″W
- Country: United States
- State: Massachusetts
- County: Berkshire
- Town: Adams

Area
  - Total: 2.47 sq mi (6.41 km^{2})
  - Land: 2.45 sq mi (6.34 km^{2})
  - Water: 0.027 sq mi (0.07 km^{2})
- Elevation: 794 ft (242 m)

Population (2020)
  - Total: 5,466
  - Density: 2,231.3/sq mi (861.51/km^{2})
- Time zone: UTC-5 (Eastern (EST))
  - Summer (DST): UTC-4 (EDT)
- ZIP code: 01220
- Area code: 413
- FIPS code: 25-00590
- GNIS feature ID: 0607533

Adams is a census-designated place (CDP) located in the town of Adams in Berkshire County, Massachusetts, United States. The population was 5,515 at the 2010 census, out of 8,485 in the entire town of Adams.

== Geography ==
Adams CDP is located in the center of the town of Adams at 42°37′31″N 73°7′5″W (42.625349, -73.118249). Massachusetts Route 8 passes through the center of the community, leading north to North Adams and south towards Pittsfield. Massachusetts Route 116 leaves southeast from the center of town, leading eventually to Amherst in the Connecticut River valley.

According to the United States Census Bureau, the Adams CDP has a total area of 2.3 square miles (5.9 km^{2}), of which 2.2 square miles (5.8 km^{2}) is land and 0.04 square miles (0.1 km^{2}), or 1.36%, is water.

== Demographics ==
Historical population
Census	Pop.	Note	%±
2020	5,466		—
U.S. Decennial Census

As of the census of 2000, there were 5,784 people, 2,729 households, and 1,555 families residing in the CDP. The population density was 988.1/km^{2} (2,554.6/mi^{2}). There were 3,005 housing units at an average density of 513.4/km^{2} (1,327.2/mi^{2}). The racial makeup of the CDP was 98.24% White, 0.35% Black or African American, 0.12% Native American, 0.21% Asian, 0.03% Pacific Islander, 0.36% from other races, and 0.69% from two or more races. Hispanic or Latino of any race were 1.02% of the population.

There were 2,729 households, out of which 25.2% had children under the age of 18 living with them, 40.1% were married couples living together, 12.4% had a female householder with no husband present, and 43.0% were non-families. 39.2% of all households were made up of individuals, and 20.6% had someone living alone who was 65 years of age or older. The average household size was 2.12 and the average family size was 2.80.

In the CDP, the population was spread out, with 21.9% under the age of 18, 6.5% from 18 to 24, 26.5% from 25 to 44, 22.9% from 45 to 64, and 22.2% who were 65 years of age or older. The median age was 42 years. For every 100 females, there were 87.4 males. For every 100 females age 18 and over, there were 82.3 males.

The median income for a household in the CDP was $28,703, and the median income for a family was $37,574. Males had a median income of $31,096 versus $23,802 for females. The per capita income for the CDP was $18,210. About 7.9% of families and 11.8% of the population were below the poverty line, including 16.7% of those under age 18 and 11.9% of those age 65 or over.
