= Berkshire County, Massachusetts =

County in Massachusetts, United States

- County
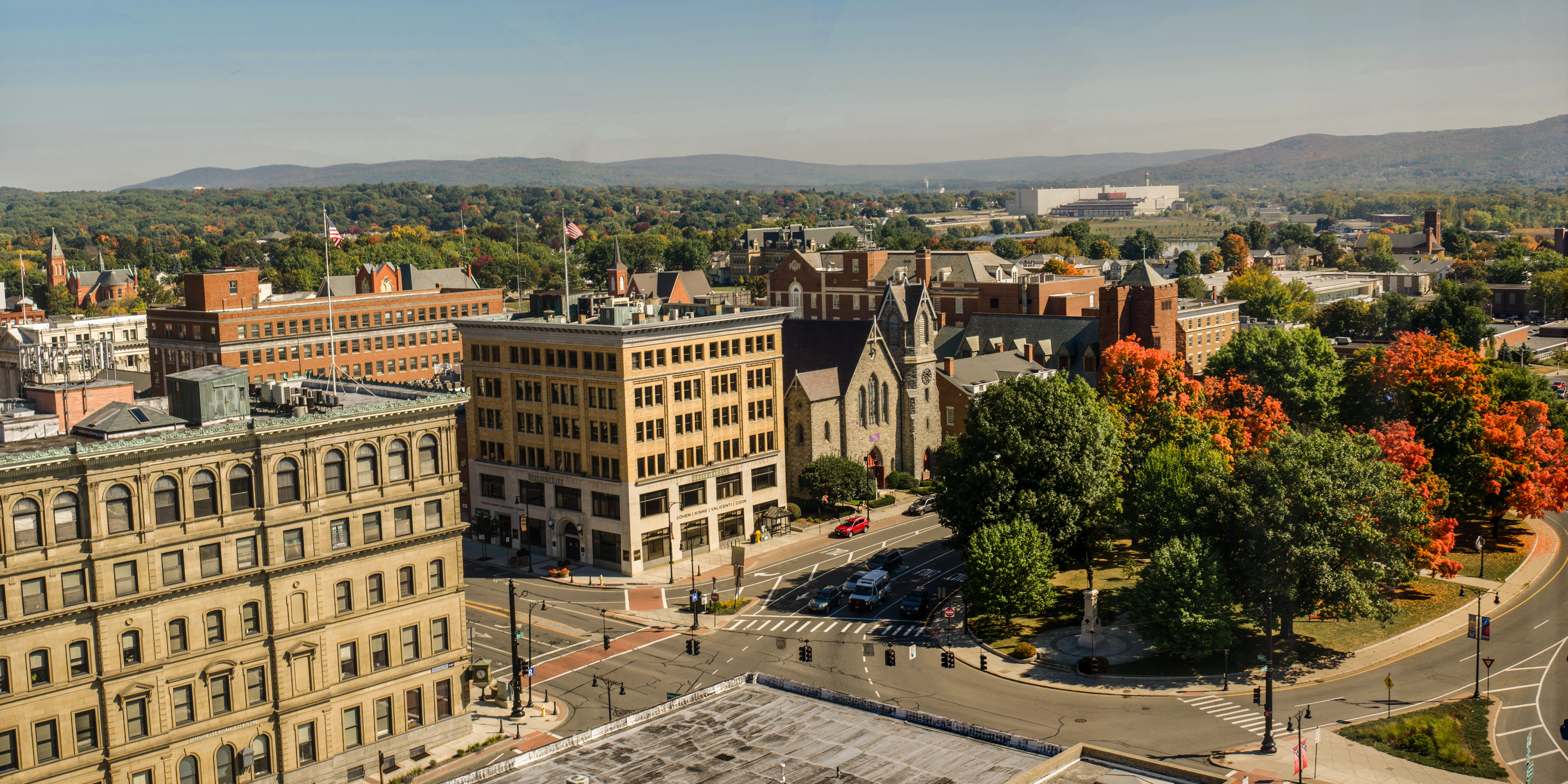
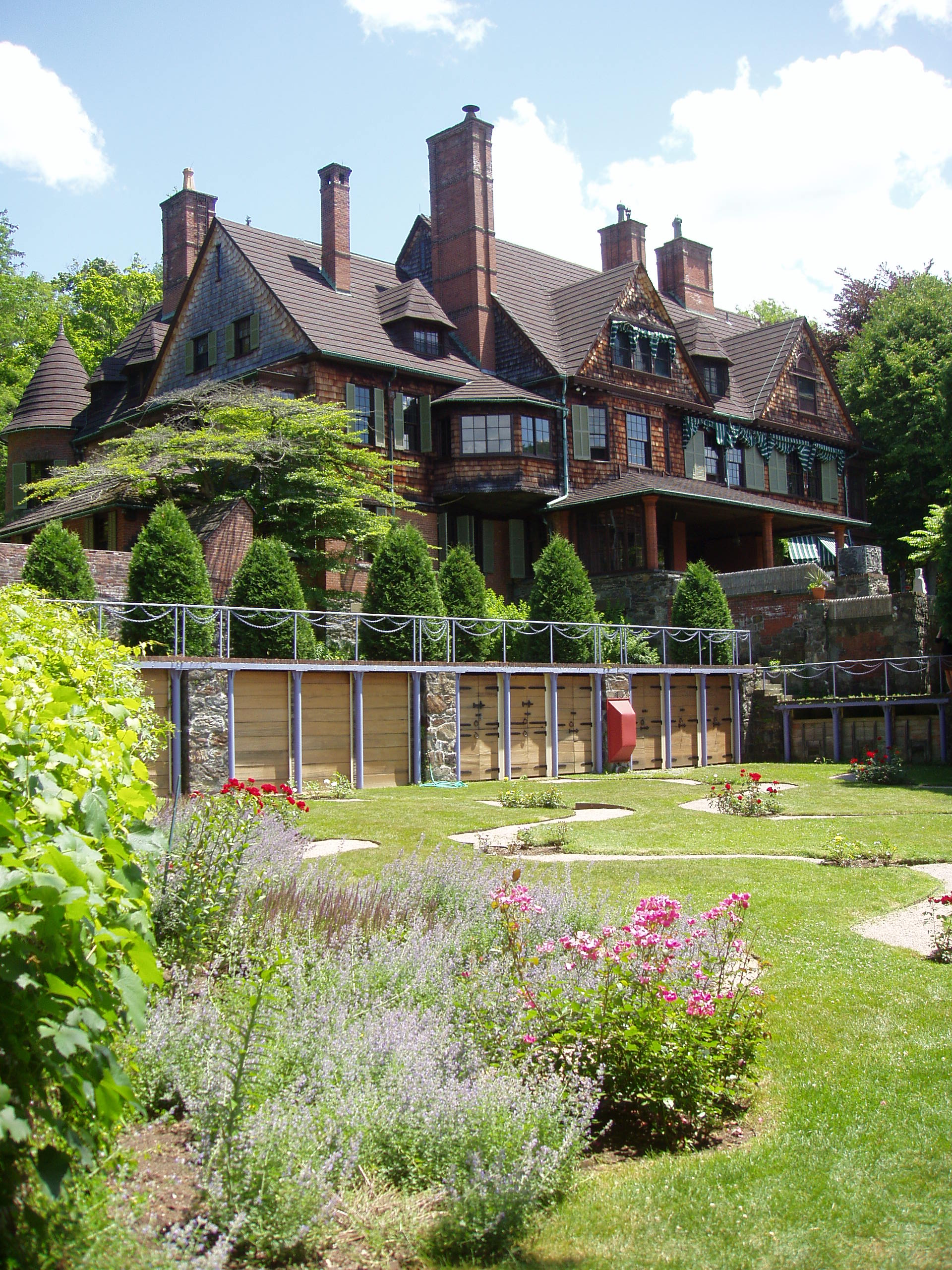
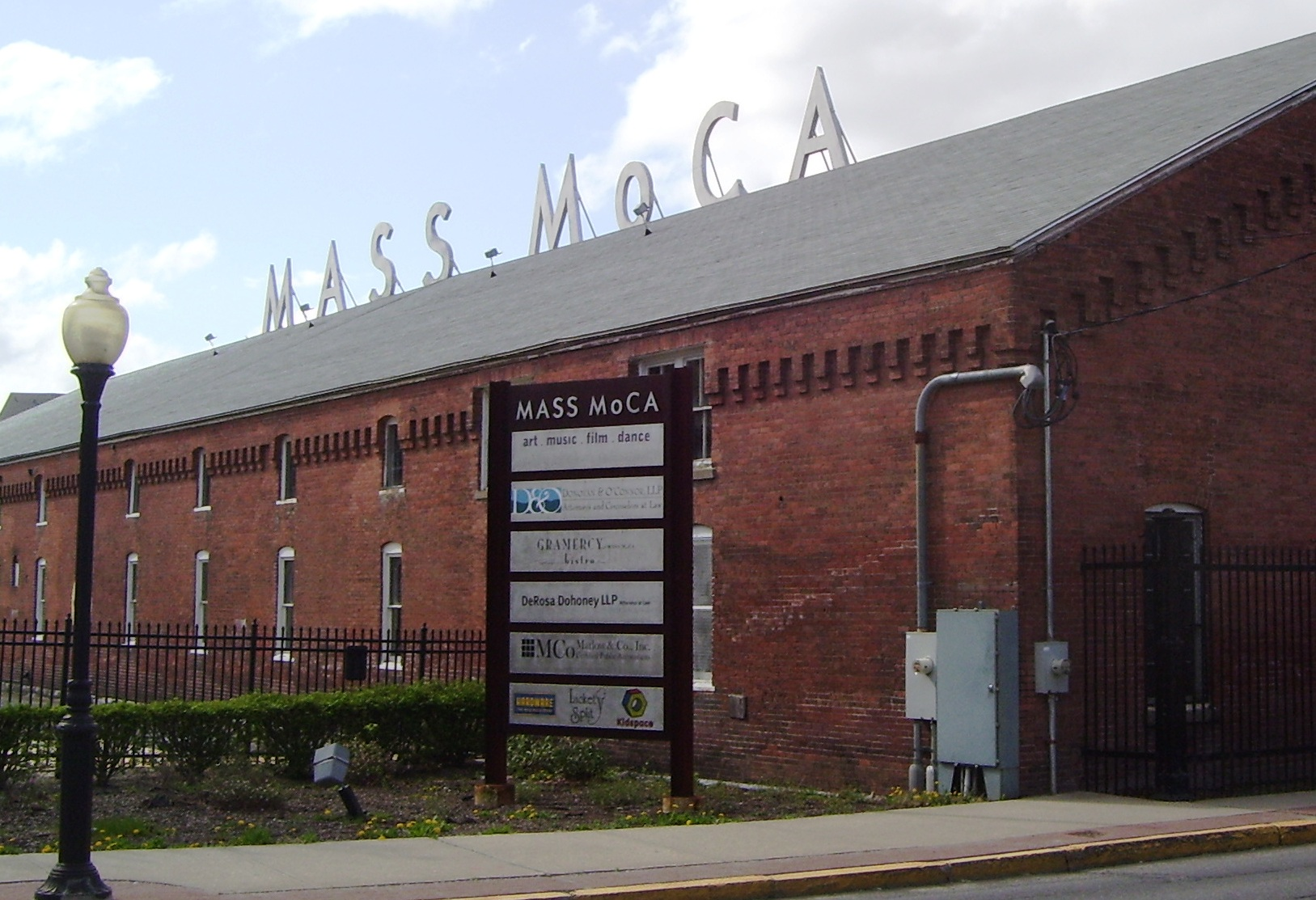
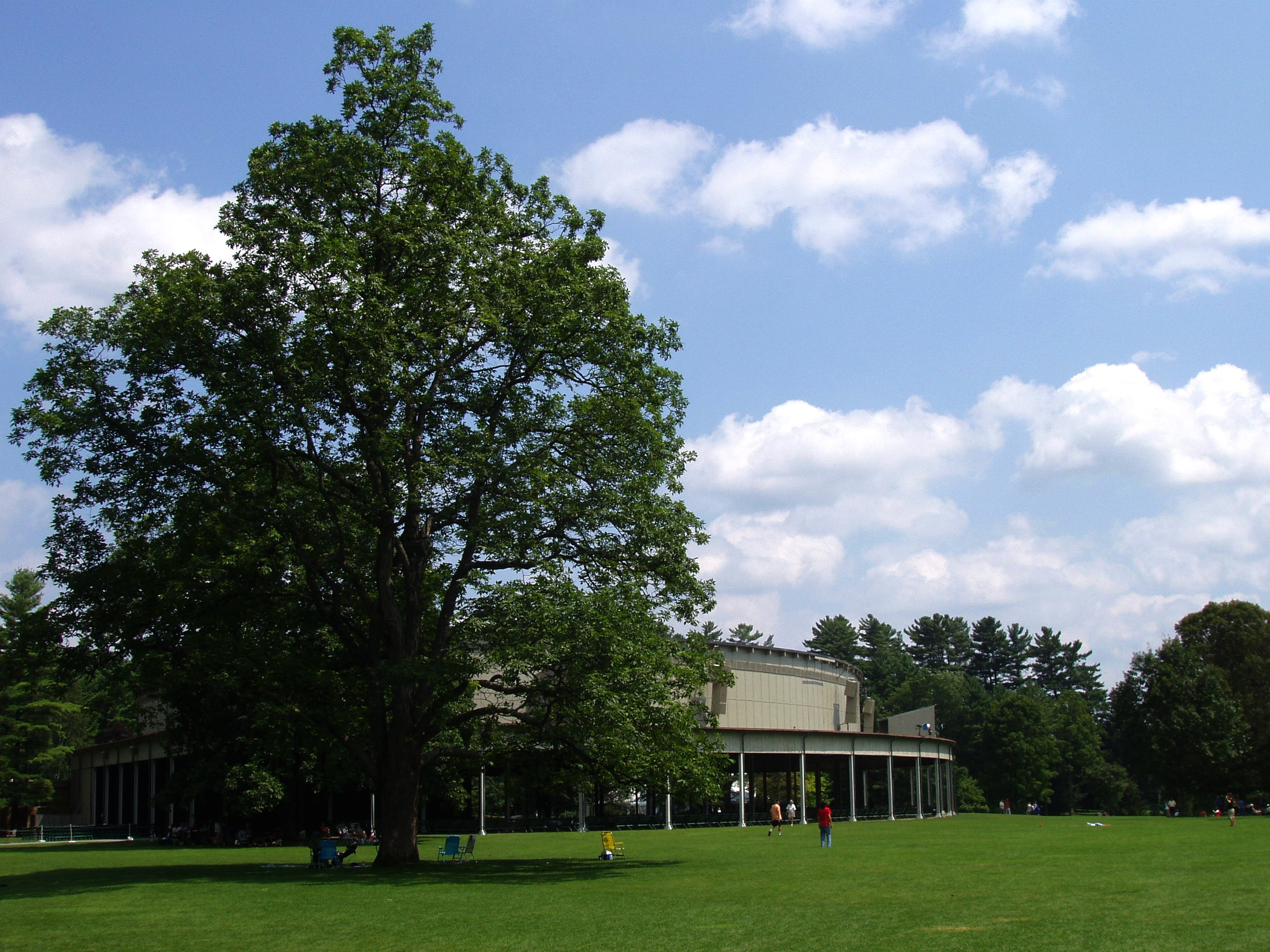
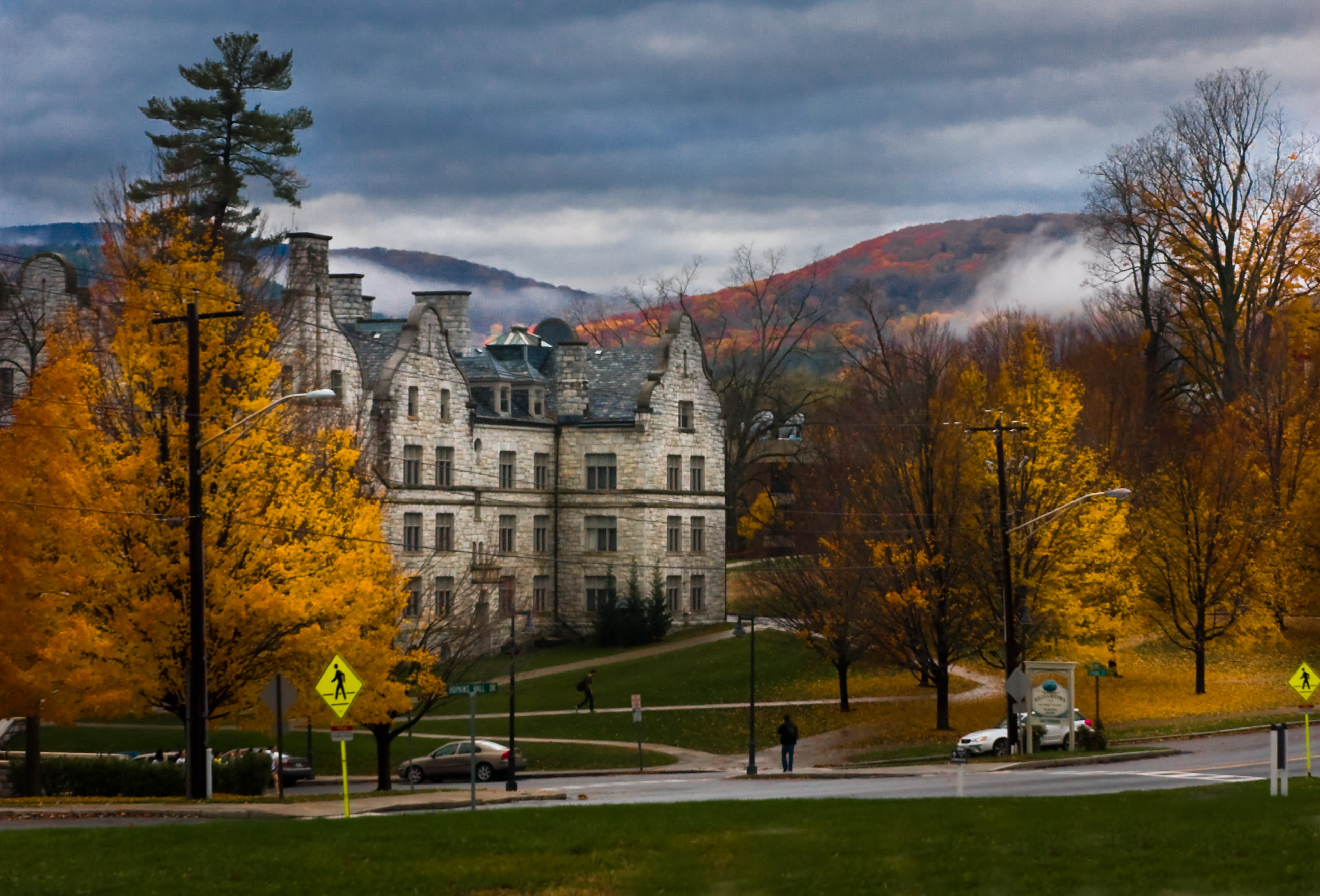
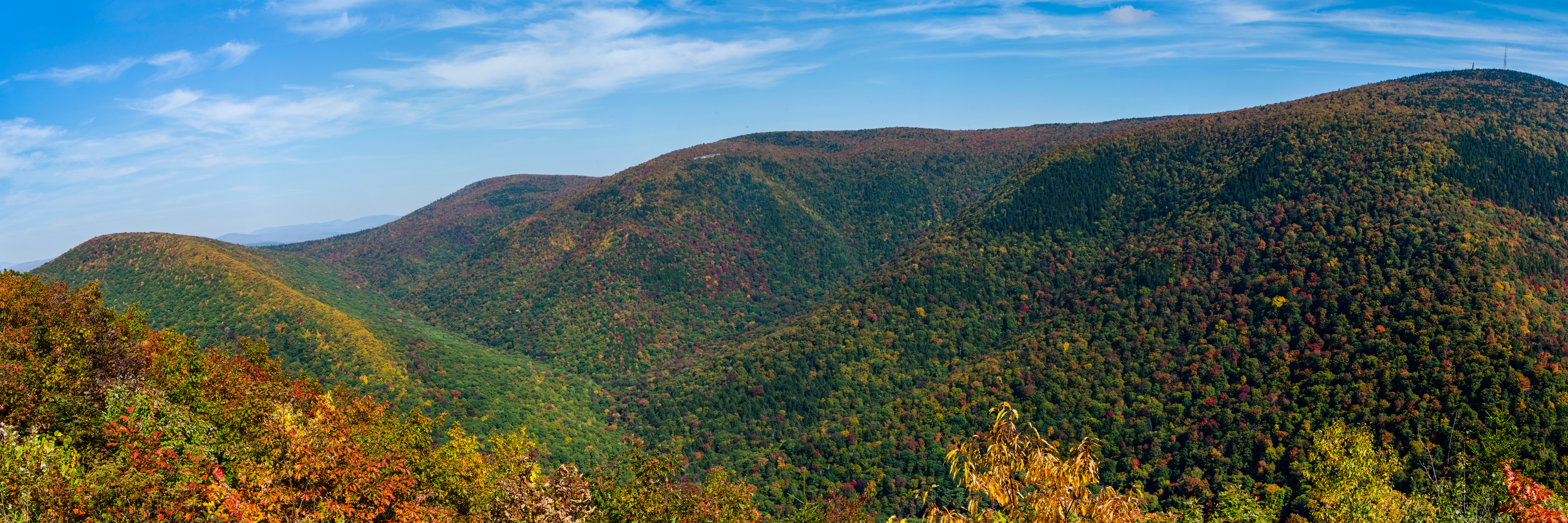
- Pittsfield Naumkeag Massachusetts Museum of Contemporary Art Tanglewood Williams College Mount Greylock

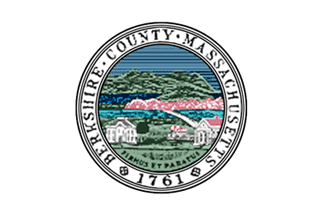
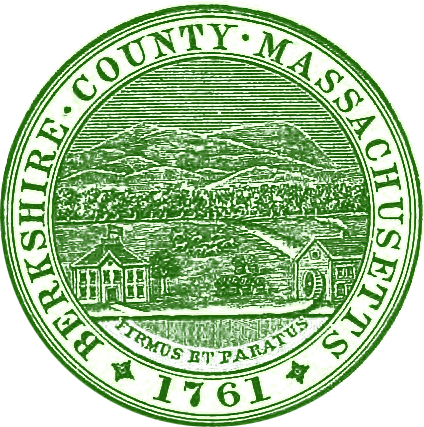
- Flag Seal
- Motto: Firmus et Paratus (Latin "Steadfast and Ready")
- Location within the U.S. state of Massachusetts
- Coordinates: 42°23′47″N 73°12′36″W
- Country: United States
- State: Massachusetts
- Founded: April 24, 1761
- Named for: Berkshire, England
- Seat: Pittsfield
- Largest city: Pittsfield

Area
  - Total: 946 sq mi (2,450 km^{2})
  - Land: 927 sq mi (2,400 km^{2})
  - Water: 20 sq mi (52 km^{2}) 2.1%

Population (2020)
  - Total: 129,026
  - Estimate (2025): 128,224 ▼
  - Density: 139/sq mi (53.7/km^{2})
- Demonym: Berkshirite
- Time zone: UTC−5 (Eastern)
  - Summer (DST): UTC−4 (EDT)
- Congressional district: 1st

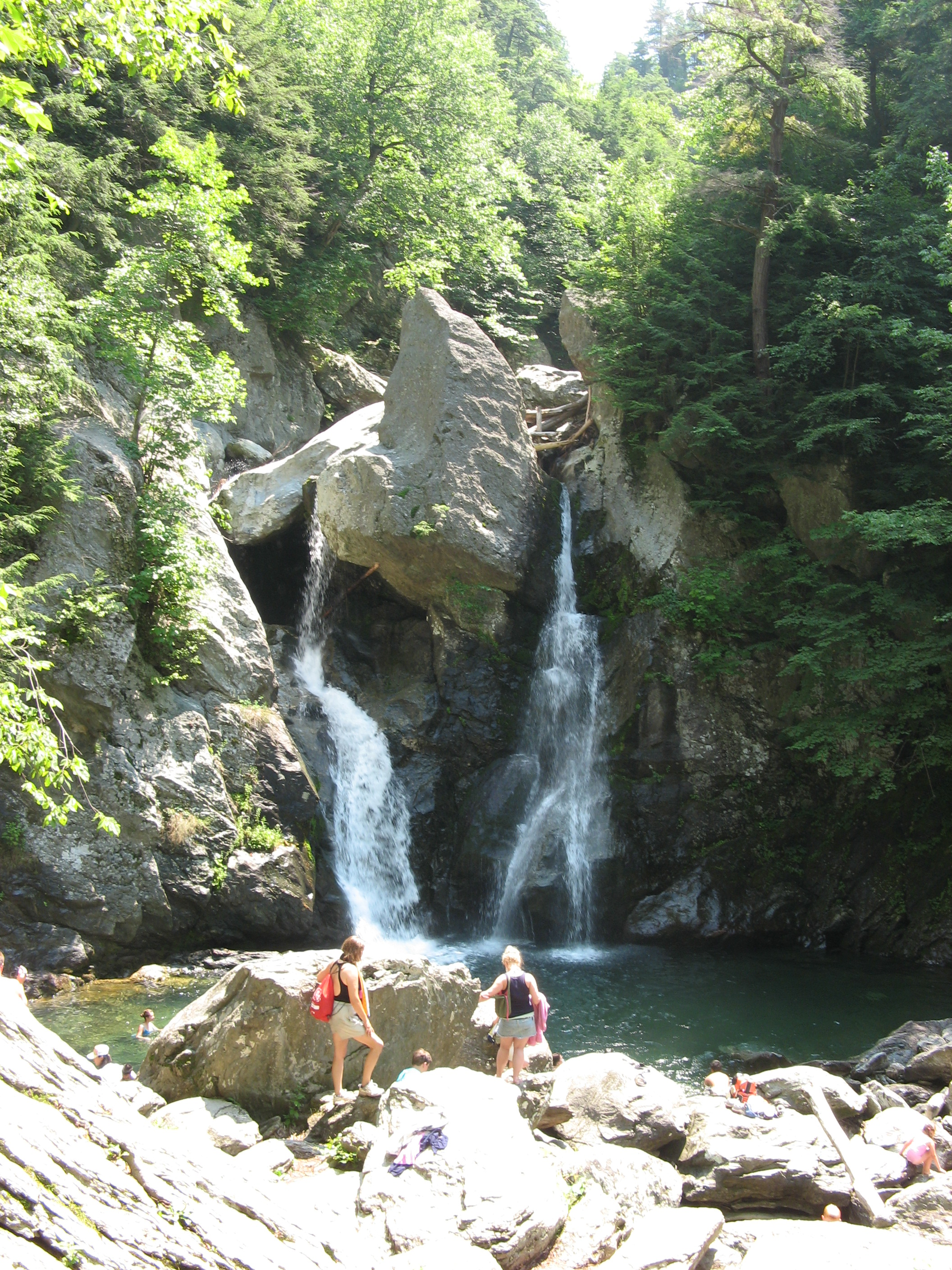
Bash Bish Falls, in the Taconic Range, Appalachian Mountains

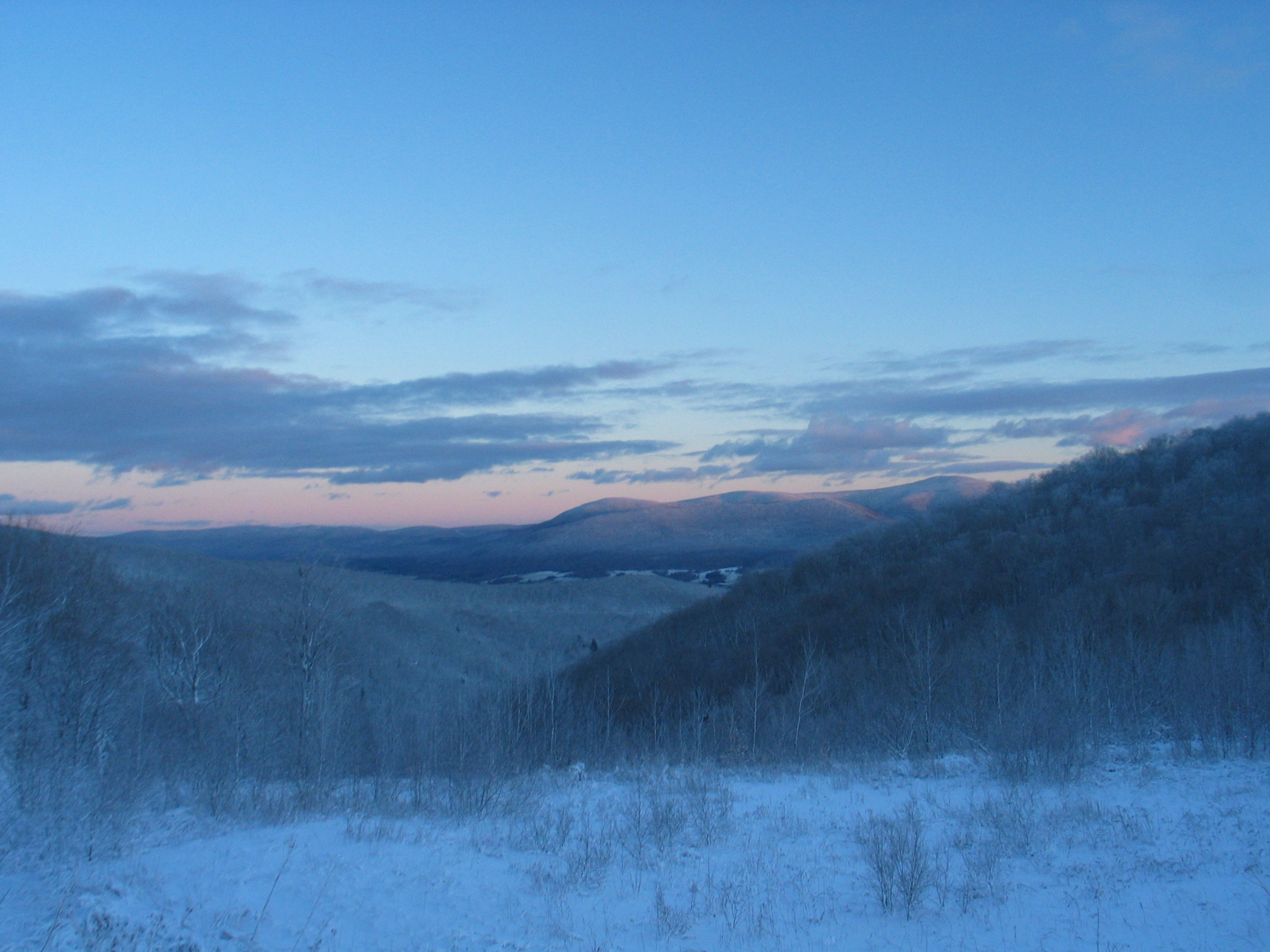
The Berkshire Hills, part of the Appalachian Mountains, in winter

Berkshire County (pronounced /ˈbɜːrkʃər/) is the westernmost county in the U.S. state of Massachusetts. As of the 2020 census, the population was 129,026. Its largest city and traditional county seat is Pittsfield. The county was founded in 1761. The Berkshire Hills are centered on Berkshire County. Residents are known as Berkshirites. It exists today only as a historical geographic region, and has no county government, with the exception of the retirement board for former county workers, and the offices of the sheriff and the registrar of deeds.

== Law and government ==
Of the fourteen Massachusetts counties, Berkshire County is one of eight that exists today only as a historical geographic region; it has limited county government. Berkshire County government was abolished effective July 1, 2000. Most former county functions were assumed by state agencies, and there is no county council or commission. The sheriff became a Commonwealth employee, but remains locally elected to perform duties within the county region and retains administrative and operational control over the Berkshire Sheriff's Office, an independent state agency created after the county government was abolished. The Berkshire Sheriff's Office runs the county jail and house of correction.

Local communities were granted the right to form their own regional compacts for sharing services, and the towns of Berkshire County have formed such a regional compact known as the Berkshire Regional Planning Commission.

Berkshire County has three Registry of Deeds Districts, one for each district.

- Berkshire Northern District in Adams contains records for the city of North Adams and the towns of Adams, Cheshire, Clarksburg, Florida, Hancock, Lanesborough, New Ashford, Savoy, Williamstown, and Windsor.
- Berkshire Middle District in Pittsfield contains records for the city of Pittsfield and the towns of Becket, Dalton, Hinsdale, Lee, Lenox, Otis, Peru, Richmond, Stockbridge, Tyringham and Washington.
- Berkshire Southern District in Great Barrington contains records for the towns of Alford, Egremont, Great Barrington, Monterey, Mount Washington, New Marlborough, Sandisfield, Sheffield and West Stockbridge.

County government: Berkshire County
Clerk of Courts:	Lisa Denault-Viale
District Attorney:	Timothy Shugrue
Register of Deeds:	Maria T. Ziemba (Northern District at Adams); Patsy Harris (Middle District at Pittsfield); Michelle Laramee-Jenny (Southern District at Great Barrington)
Register of Probate:	Anthony Patella
County Sheriff:	Thomas Bowler
State government
State Representative(s):	3 Representatives: John Barrett III (D), First Berkshire; Tricia Farley-Bouvier (D), Second Berkshire; Leigh Davis (D), Third Berkshire
State Senator(s):	1 Senator: Paul Mark (D)
Governor's Councilor(s):	Tara Jacobs (D) - District 8
Federal government
U.S. Representative(s):	Richard Neal (D-1st District)
U.S. Senators:	Elizabeth Warren (D), Ed Markey (D)

Berkshire County is in the Massachusetts's 1st congressional district, a primarily rural district that makes up most of Western Massachusetts.

Berkshire County has three districts and elected Representatives in the Massachusetts House of Representatives.

- First Berkshire. – Consisting of the towns of Adams, Cheshire, Clarksburg, Florida, Hancock, Hinsdale, Lanesborough, New Ashford, North Adams, Peru, Savoy, Williamstown, and Windsor, all in the county of Berkshire. John Barrett III(D) is the current Representative.
- Second Berkshire. – Consisting of the city of Pittsfield in the county of Berkshire. Tricia Farley-Bouvier (D) is the current Representative.
- Third Berkshire. – Consisting of the towns of Alford, Becket, Dalton, Egremont, Great Barrington, Lee, Lenox, Monterey, Mount Washington, New Marlborough, Otis, Richmond, Sandisfield, Sheffield, Stockbridge, Tyringham, Washington, and West Stockbridge, all in the county of Berkshire. Leigh Davis (D) is the current Representative.

Berkshire County comprises only part of one district for the Massachusetts Senate due to its low population. The district consists of all 32 cities and towns in Berkshire County as well as the following 25 communities: Ashfield, Buckland, Charlemont, Colrain, Conway, Hawley, Heath, Monroe, Shelburne, Rowe and Whately, in the county of Franklin; Blandford, Chester, Granville, Southwick, and Tolland in the county of Hampden; Chesterfield, Cummington, Goshen, Huntington, Middlefield, Plainfield, Westhampton, Williamsburg and Worthington, in the county of Hampshire. Paul Mark (D) is the current Senator.

The Massachusetts Governor's Council, also known as the Executive Council, is composed of eight individuals elected from districts, and the Lt. Governor who serves ex officio. The eight councillors are elected from their respective districts every two years. Berkshire County is part of the 8th District. County resident Tara Jacobs (D-North Adams), who took office in 2023, is the first woman from the county ever to hold a Council seat.

The Council generally meets at noon on Wednesdays in its State House Chamber, next to the Governor's Office, to act on issues such as payments from the state treasury, criminal pardons and commutations, and approval of gubernatorial appointments such as judges, notaries and justices of the peace.

See also the League of Women Voters of Massachusetts former page on counties (more detailed and with map) and its current page on counties (also useful).

== Geography ==
According to the U.S. Census Bureau, the county has a total area of 946 square miles (2,450 km^{2}) of which 927 square miles (2,400 km^{2}) is land and 20 square miles (52 km^{2}) (2.1%) is water. It is the second-largest county in Massachusetts by land area, only behind Worcester. The highest natural point in Massachusetts, Mount Greylock at 3,492 feet (1,064 m), is in Berkshire County.

Berkshire County is one of two Massachusetts counties that borders three neighboring states (Vermont, New York and Connecticut); the other is Worcester County. The two counties are also the only ones to touch both the northern and southern state lines.

Running north-south through the county are the Hoosac Range of the Berkshire Hills in the eastern part of the county and the Taconic Mountains in the western part of the county. Due to their elevation, the Berkshires attract tourists and summer residents eager to escape the heat of the lowlands.

=== Adjacent counties ===
- Bennington County, Vermont (north)
- Franklin County (northeast)
- Hampshire County (east)
- Hampden County (southeast)
- Litchfield County, Connecticut (south)
- Dutchess County, New York (southwest)
- Columbia County, New York (west)
- Rensselaer County, New York (northwest)

== Demographics ==
Historical population
Census	Pop.	Note	%±
1790	30,263		—
1800	33,885		12.0%
1810	35,907		6.0%
1820	35,720		−0.5%
1830	37,835		5.9%
1840	41,745		10.3%
1850	49,591		18.8%
1860	55,120		11.1%
1870	64,827		17.6%
1880	69,032		6.5%
1890	81,108		17.5%
1900	95,667		18.0%
1910	105,259		10.0%
1920	113,033		7.4%
1930	120,700		6.8%
1940	122,273		1.3%
1950	132,966		8.7%
1960	142,135		6.9%
1970	149,402		5.1%
1980	145,110		−2.9%
1990	139,352		−4.0%
2000	134,953		−3.2%
2010	131,219		−2.8%
2020	129,026		−1.7%
2025 (est.)	128,224	▼	−0.6%
U.S. Decennial Census; 1790–1960 1900–1990; 1990–2000 2010–2018

=== 2020 census ===
As of the 2020 census, the county had a population of 129,026. Of the residents, 17.3% were under the age of 18 and 24.4% were 65 years of age or older; the median age was 47.8 years. For every 100 females there were 94.7 males, and for every 100 females age 18 and over there were 93.1 males. 65.3% of residents lived in urban areas and 34.7% lived in rural areas.

The racial makeup of the county was 90.5% White, 4.1% Black or African American, 0.4% American Indian and Alaska Native, 2.1% Asian, 0.1% Native Hawaiian and Pacific Islander, and 2.8% two or more races. Hispanic or Latino residents of any race comprised 6.3% of the population.

There were 57,015 households in the county, of which 22.1% had children under the age of 18 living with them and 30.4% had a female householder with no spouse or partner present. About 35.3% of all households were made up of individuals and 16.9% had someone living alone who was 65 years of age or older.

There were 69,759 housing units, of which 18.3% were vacant. Among occupied housing units, 66.7% were owner-occupied and 33.3% were renter-occupied. The homeowner vacancy rate was 1.6% and the rental vacancy rate was 7.4%.

=== Racial and ethnic composition ===
Berkshire County, Massachusetts – Racial and ethnic composition Note: the US Census treats Hispanic/Latino as an ethnic category. This table excludes Latinos from the racial categories and assigns them to a separate category. Hispanics/Latinos may be of any race.
Race / Ethnicity (NH = Non-Hispanic)	Pop 1980	Pop 1990	Pop 2000	Pop 2010	Pop 2020	% 1980	% 1990	% 2000	% 2010	% 2020
White alone (NH)	141,395	134,177	126,961	118,926	109,263	97.44%	96.29%	94.08%	90.63%	84.68%
Black or African American alone (NH)	2,000	2,454	2,570	3,334	4,064	1.38%	1.76%	1.90%	2.54%	3.15%
Native American or Alaska Native alone (NH)	116	214	177	197	165	0.08%	0.15%	0.13%	0.15%	0.13%
Asian alone (NH)	458	966	1,312	1,602	1,999	0.32%	0.69%	0.97%	1.22%	1.55%
Native Hawaiian or Pacific Islander alone (NH)	x	x	40	23	18	x	x	0.03%	0.02%	0.01%
Other race alone (NH)	267	134	161	239	632	0.18%	0.10%	0.12%	0.18%	0.49%
Mixed race or Multiracial (NH)	x	x	1,446	2,368	5,821	x	x	1.07%	1.80%	4.51%
Hispanic or Latino (any race)	874	1,407	2,286	4,530	7,064	0.60%	1.01%	1.69%	3.45%	5.47%
Total	145,110	139,352	134,953	131,219	129,026	100.00%	100.00%	100.00%	100.00%	100.00%

=== 2010 census ===
At the 2010 census, there were 131,219 people, 56,091 households, and 33,618 families in the county. The population density was 141.6 inhabitants per square mile (54.7/km^{2}). There were 68,508 housing units at an average density of 73.9 per square mile (28.5/km^{2}). The racial makeup of the county was 92.5% white, 2.7% black or African American, 1.2% Asian, 0.2% American Indian, 1.2% from other races, and 2.1% from two or more races. Those of Hispanic or Latino origin made up 3.5% of the population. The largest ancestry groups were:

- 23.5% Irish
- 16.9% Italian
- 16.1% French
- 14.3% English
- 12.1% German
- 9.6% Polish
- 4.9% French Canadian
- 3.7% Scottish
- 3.0% American
- 2.0% Scotch-Irish
- 2.0% Russian
- 2.0% Dutch
- 1.5% Swedish
- 1.3% Portuguese
- 1.1% Puerto Rican

Of the 56,091 households, 25.9% had children under the age of 18 living with them, 43.9% were married couples living together, 11.5% had a female householder with no husband present, 40.1% were non-families, and 33.0% of households were made up of individuals. The average household size was 2.23 and the average family size was 2.82. The median age was 44.7 years.

The median household income was $48,907 and the median family income was $64,783. Males had a median income of $47,401 versus $35,964 for females. The per capita income for the county was $28,300. About 7.9% of families and 11.6% of the population were below the poverty line, including 15.5% of those under age 18 and 7.3% of those age 65 or over.

=== 2000 census ===
At the 2000 census there were 134,953 people, 56,006 households, and 35,115 families in the county. The population density was 145 people per square mile (56 people/km^{2}). There were 66,301 housing units at an average density of 71 per square mile (27/km^{2}). The county's racial makeup was 95.02% White, 1.99% Black or African American, 0.15% Native American, 0.99% Asian, 0.04% Pacific Islander, 0.59% from other races, and 1.23% from two or more races. 1.69%. were Hispanic or Latino of any race. 16.5% were of Italian, 16.4% Irish, 10.8% French, 10.3% English, 8.0% Polish, 7.1% German, 5.8% American and 5.1% French Canadian ancestry, 94.1% spoke English, 1.6% Spanish and 1.1% French as their first language.

Of the 56,006 households 27.50% had children under the age of 18 living with them, 48.00% were married couples living together, 11.00% had a female householder with no husband present, and 37.30% were non-families. 31.60% of households were one person and 13.90% were one person aged 65 or older. The average household size was 2.30 and the average family size was 2.89.

The age distribution was 22.40% under the age of 18, 8.40% from 18 to 24, 26.40% from 25 to 44, 24.90% from 45 to 64, and 17.90% 65 or older. The median age was 40 years. For every 100 females there were 91.70 males. For every 100 females age 18 and over, there were 88.10 males.

The county's median household income was $39,047, and the median family income was $50,162. Males had a median income of $36,692 versus $26,504 for females. The county's per capita income was $21,807. About 6.50% of families and 9.50% of the population were below the poverty line, including 12.30% of those under age 18 and 7.20% of those age 65 or over.

=== Demographic breakdown by town ===
==== Income ====
The ranking of unincorporated communities included on the list are reflective if the census designated locations and villages were included as cities or towns. Data is from the 2007–2011 American Community Survey 5-Year Estimates.

Rank	Town		Per capita income	Median household income	Median family income	Population	Number of households
1	Tyringham	Town	$55,836	$94,375	$126,875	358	149
2	Richmond	Town	$51,808	$88,125	$94,423	1,671	702
3	Alford	Town	$49,272	$85,833	$102,750	501	232
4	Otis	Town	$44,085	$63,672	$70,547	1,248	571
5	Mount Washington	Town	$40,073	$68,750	$69,688	150	64
6	Williamstown	Town	$39,451	$72,743	$97,060	7,828	2,859
7	Egremont	Town	$39,236	$50,848	$66,500	1,043	529
8	Becket	Town	$37,233	$41,852	$62,823	1,775	790
	Lenox	CDP	$37,192	$48,158	$62,569	1,349	782
9	Sheffield	Town	$36,640	$52,181	$75,000	3,255	1,464
10	New Ashford	Town	$35,676	$63,854	$75,750	225	109
11	West Stockbridge	Town	$35,092	$75,543	$97,784	1,573	640
12	Great Barrington	Town	$34,585	$48,561	$73,369	7,131	2,792
13	Cheshire	Town	$34,413	$56,597	$74,250	3,245	1,408
14	Lenox	Town	$33,405	$54,622	$74,844	5,013	2,084
	Housatonic	CDP	$33,281	$28,837	$27,448	1,024	556
15	Windsor	Town	$33,234	$74,866	$99,091	902	321
16	Lanesborough	Town	$33,058	$66,071	$82,400	3,074	1,240
17	Washington	Town	$32,501	$69,286	$71,250	583	240
18	New Marlborough	Town	$32,451	$67,528	$68,750	1,499	591
19	Monterey	Town	$32,404	$42,083	$47,625	793	302
20	Stockbridge	Town	$31,821	$53,698	$69,038	1,755	765
	Williamstown	CDP	$31,808	$46,622	$100,833	3,652	1,312
21	Sandisfield	Town	$31,746	$60,104	$69,706	985	381
22	Hinsdale	Town	$30,753	$62,596	$71,442	2,136	860
23	Hancock	Town	$29,851	$78,571	$79,911	713	254
	Berkshire County	County	$29,387	$48,705	$64,393	131,221	55,793
	Great Barrington	CDP	$28,282	$40,393	$66,500	2,464	1,021
24	Lee	Town	$28,270	$51,835	$67,407	5,932	2,486
25	Peru	Town	$28,080	$68,523	$72,344	863	337
26	Savoy	Town	$27,725	$58,068	$58,452	706	293
	Lee	CDP	$27,549	$43,750	$70,417	1,843	874
27	Dalton	Town	$26,854	$52,285	$61,739	6,753	2,663
28	Pittsfield	City	$26,767	$44,513	$57,673	44,691	19,966
29	Florida	Town	$25,666	$46,458	$58,281	719	337
	Adams	CDP	$25,096	$38,256	$46,554	5,367	2,508
30	Clarksburg	Town	$25,013	$54,095	$61,836	1,702	727
31	Adams	Town	$24,423	$39,080	$46,021	8,494	3,770
32	North Adams	City	$20,330	$36,424	$51,028	13,763	5,867
	Cheshire	CDP	$14,088	$47,361	$56,125	610	209

== Politics ==
United States presidential election results for Berkshire County, Massachusetts
Year	Republican		Democratic		Third party(ies)	
Year	No.	%	No.	%	No.	%
1804	2,146	58.54%	1,520	41.46%	0	0.00%
1812	2,268	58.99%	1,577	41.01%	0	0.00%
1820	1,296	51.49%	1,221	48.51%	0	0.00%
1824	2,381	78.68%	645	21.32%	0	0.00%
1828	2,500	64.85%	1,355	35.15%	0	0.00%
1832	2,465	57.84%	1,612	37.82%	185	4.34%
1836	2,764	49.34%	2,838	50.66%	0	0.00%
1840	3,931	50.55%	3,780	48.60%	66	0.85%
1844	3,656	46.03%	3,885	48.92%	401	5.05%
1848	3,549	47.41%	2,387	31.89%	1,549	20.69%
1852	3,579	49.81%	2,973	41.38%	633	8.81%
1856	5,344	63.09%	2,749	32.46%	377	4.45%
1860	5,202	61.17%	2,865	33.69%	437	5.14%
1864	5,314	61.24%	3,363	38.76%	0	0.00%
1868	5,492	59.22%	3,782	40.78%	0	0.00%
1872	6,047	64.07%	3,391	35.93%	0	0.00%
1876	6,015	52.32%	5,478	47.65%	4	0.03%
1880	6,386	55.70%	5,034	43.91%	44	0.38%
1884	5,901	49.73%	5,519	46.51%	445	3.75%
1888	6,826	51.33%	6,070	45.64%	403	3.03%
1892	7,336	50.60%	6,697	46.19%	465	3.21%
1896	9,710	67.91%	3,913	27.37%	676	4.73%
1900	8,980	60.28%	5,461	36.66%	455	3.05%
1904	9,310	58.85%	5,800	36.66%	711	4.49%
1908	9,137	57.17%	5,903	36.94%	941	5.89%
1912	6,397	37.19%	6,211	36.10%	4,595	26.71%
1916	9,787	52.09%	8,357	44.48%	645	3.43%
1920	20,138	63.11%	10,956	34.33%	816	2.56%
1924	21,106	61.05%	9,712	28.09%	3,753	10.86%
1928	23,855	49.52%	24,075	49.98%	244	0.51%
1932	23,186	48.08%	23,252	48.22%	1,782	3.70%
1936	22,607	42.20%	29,087	54.30%	1,874	3.50%
1940	25,973	44.11%	32,620	55.40%	287	0.49%
1944	24,830	44.16%	31,212	55.51%	185	0.33%
1948	27,482	46.37%	30,668	51.75%	1,117	1.88%
1952	38,413	56.13%	29,785	43.52%	243	0.36%
1956	41,355	61.75%	25,361	37.87%	257	0.38%
1960	27,335	39.83%	41,132	59.93%	162	0.24%
1964	15,160	23.57%	48,839	75.92%	332	0.52%
1968	23,078	35.80%	38,497	59.72%	2,890	4.48%
1972	30,380	45.83%	35,391	53.39%	513	0.77%
1976	27,462	39.87%	39,337	57.12%	2,072	3.01%
1980	27,063	39.78%	29,458	43.30%	11,510	16.92%
1984	33,712	52.85%	29,745	46.63%	328	0.51%
1988	24,125	38.38%	38,208	60.78%	526	0.84%
1992	14,726	21.74%	36,857	54.40%	16,163	23.86%
1996	13,055	21.48%	39,338	64.73%	8,381	13.79%
2000	15,805	26.60%	37,934	63.85%	5,672	9.55%
2004	16,806	25.74%	47,743	73.12%	742	1.14%
2008	14,876	22.50%	49,558	74.94%	1,696	2.56%
2012	14,252	22.10%	48,843	75.74%	1,391	2.16%
2016	16,839	25.66%	43,714	66.62%	5,064	7.72%
2020	18,064	25.31%	51,705	72.44%	1,606	2.25%
2024	19,805	28.84%	47,094	68.58%	1,775	2.58%

In the 2016 and 2020 U.S. presidential elections, Berkshire County was Massachusetts's third-bluest county behind Suffolk County, which consists primarily of Boston, and Dukes County, home to Martha's Vineyard. In 2020, the county voted for Joe Biden by a 47.1% margin over Donald Trump, 72.4% to 25.3%.

=== Voter registration ===
Voter registration and party enrollment as of February 2024
Unenrolled	60,723	62.78%
Democratic	28,158	29.11%
Republican	6,786	7.02%
Libertarian	394	0.41%
Other parties	656	0.68%
Total	96,717	100%

== History ==
The Mahican (Muh-he-ka-neew) Native American tribe lived in the area that now makes up Berkshire County until the early 18th century, when the first English settlers and frontiersmen appeared and began setting up farms and homesteads. On April 25, 1724, "The English finally paid the Indians 460 pounds, 3 barrels of cider, and 30 quarts of rum" for what is today southern Berkshire County. This deal did not include modern Stockbridge, Richmond, and Lenox, or any northern towns. Berkshire County was the western part of Hampshire County until separated in 1761.

In the 19th century, Berkshire County became popular with the American elite, which built what they called "cottages" throughout the countryside. The Gilded Age ended in the early 20th century with the income tax, World War I, and the Great Depression. In the 20th century, some of these cottages were torn or burned down, while others became prep schools, historic sites, or bed-and-breakfast inns.

Today Berkshire is known throughout the East Coast and the country as the summer home of the Boston Symphony Orchestra at Tanglewood. It includes attractions such as the Clark Art Institute, Norman Rockwell Museum, Naumkeag, Mass MOCA, and Hancock Shaker Village.

== Communities ==
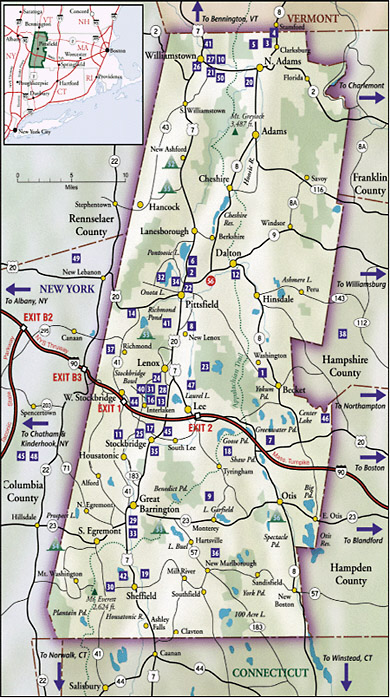
Map of Berkshire County

=== Cities ===
- North Adams
- Pittsfield (county seat)

=== Towns ===
- Adams
- Alford
- Becket
- Cheshire
- Clarksburg
- Dalton
- Egremont
- Florida
- Great Barrington
- Hancock
- Hinsdale
- Lanesborough
- Lee
- Lenox
- Monterey
- Mount Washington
- New Ashford
- New Marlborough
- Otis
- Peru
- Richmond
- Sandisfield
- Savoy
- Sheffield
- Stockbridge
- Tyringham
- Washington
- West Stockbridge
- Williamstown
- Windsor

=== Census-designated places ===
- Adams
- Cheshire
- Great Barrington
- Housatonic
- Lee
- Lenox
- Lenox Dale
- Williamstown

== Transportation ==
County-wide bus service is provided by the Berkshire Regional Transit Authority. Amtrak train service and Peter Pan intercity bus service is provided at Pittsfield.

=== Airports ===
- Harriman-and-West Airport
- Pittsfield Municipal Airport (Massachusetts)
- Walter J. Koladza Airport

=== Major highways ===
- I-90 / Mass Pike
- US 7
- US 20
- Route 2
- Route 7A
- Route 8
  - Route 8A
- Route 9
- Route 23
- Route 41
- Route 43
- Route 57
- Route 71
- Route 102
- Route 116
- Route 143
- Route 183
- Route 295

== Notable residents ==
- Scholar and civil rights activist W.E.B. Du Bois was born in Great Barrington, MA. His birthplace and other sites of interest are part of the Upper Housatonic Valley African American Heritage Trail.
- Folk singer Arlo Guthrie resides in Berkshire County.
- Author Nathaniel Hawthorne resided at the "Little Red House" in Lenox, MA near the grounds of the Tanglewood Music Festival, where he wrote The House of Seven Gables and other novels.
- Author Herman Melville resided at Arrowhead in Pittsfield, MA, where he wrote the novel Moby Dick.
- Artist Norman Rockwell resided in Stockbridge, MA.
- Singer-songwriter and guitarist James Taylor resides in Berkshire County.
- Author Edith Wharton kept a home in Lenox, MA.
- Actor Mark Wahlberg often spends time in Berkshire County, and has a residence in Pittsfield, MA.
- Actress Elizabeth Banks is from Pittsfield, MA. and often comes back and visits.
- Actress Karen Allen lives in Monterey.
- Cellist Yo-Yo Ma has a home in Tyringham.

== Economy ==
This county is the highest milk producer in the state.

== See also ==
- List of Massachusetts locations by per capita income
- Registry of Deeds (Massachusetts)
- National Register of Historic Places listings in Berkshire County, Massachusetts
- USS Berkshire County (LST-288)
- List of counties in Massachusetts
