= Harriman Dam =

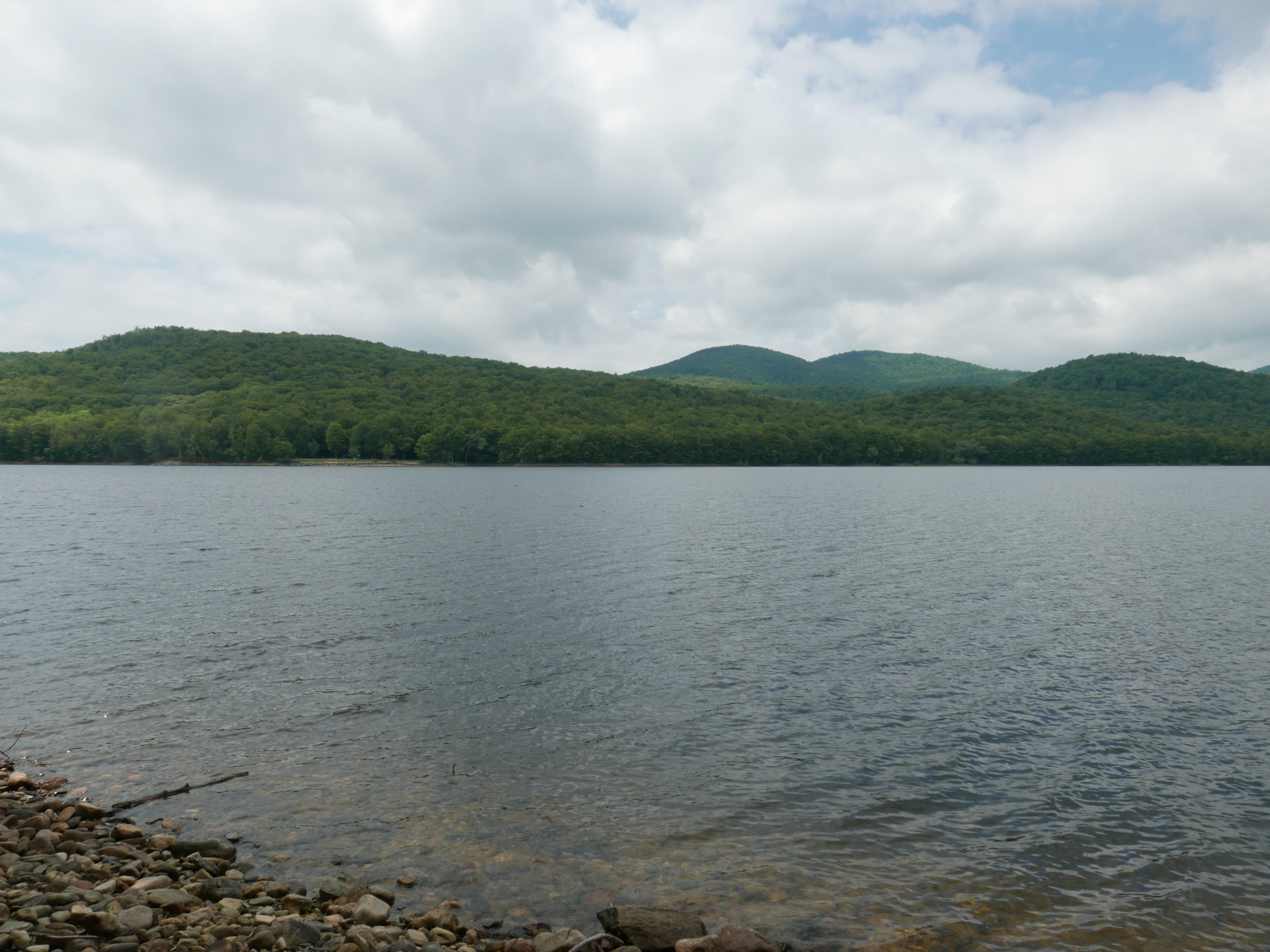

- Location within Vermont
- Interactive map of Harriman Dam
- Country: United States
- Location: Whitingham, Vermont
- Coordinates: 42°47′37″N 72°54′53″W
- Purpose: Hydroelectric
- Status: Operational
- Opening date: 1923
- Built by: New England Power Company
- Owner: Great River Hydro LLC
- Operator: Great River Hydro LLC

Dam and spillways
- Type of dam: Earthen
- Impounds: Deerfield River
- Height (foundation): 215 ft (66 m)
- Length: 1,250 ft (380 m)
- Spillways: 1
- Spillway type: Glory Hole (conical drain)

Reservoir
- Creates: Harriman Reservoir
- Total capacity: 117,300 acre⋅ft (144,700,000 m^{3})
- Surface area: 2,039 acres (825 ha)
- Maximum water depth: 180 ft (55 m)

Power Station
- Coordinates: 42.813°N 72.903°W
- Operator: Great River Hydro LLC
- Commission date: 1923
- Type: Hydroelectric

Harriman Dam is a hydroelectric dam in Windham County, Vermont in the town of Whitingham. The water from the dam flows through a penstock to a power generation plant in the adjacent town of Readsboro.

The dam was built in 1923 by the New England Power Company. Some 215 feet (66 m) high and 1,250 feet (380 m) long as its crest, it is one of ten hydroelectric dams impounding the Deerfield River. It was purchased from the TransCanada Corporation in 2017 by Great River Hydro LLC, which currently operates the facility. It is an earthen dam with a relatively unusual concrete "glory hole" (freestanding conical drain) spillway, similar to another example at Monticello Dam in California.

Harriman Reservoir has a water surface area of 2,039 acres (825 ha), a maximum depth of 180 feet (55 m), and a gross storage capacity of 117,300 acre-feet (144.7 million cubic metres).

The dam and reservoir were named in recognition of utility executive Henry I. Harriman, a former president of the New England Power Company.
