= Whitingham, Vermont =

- Town
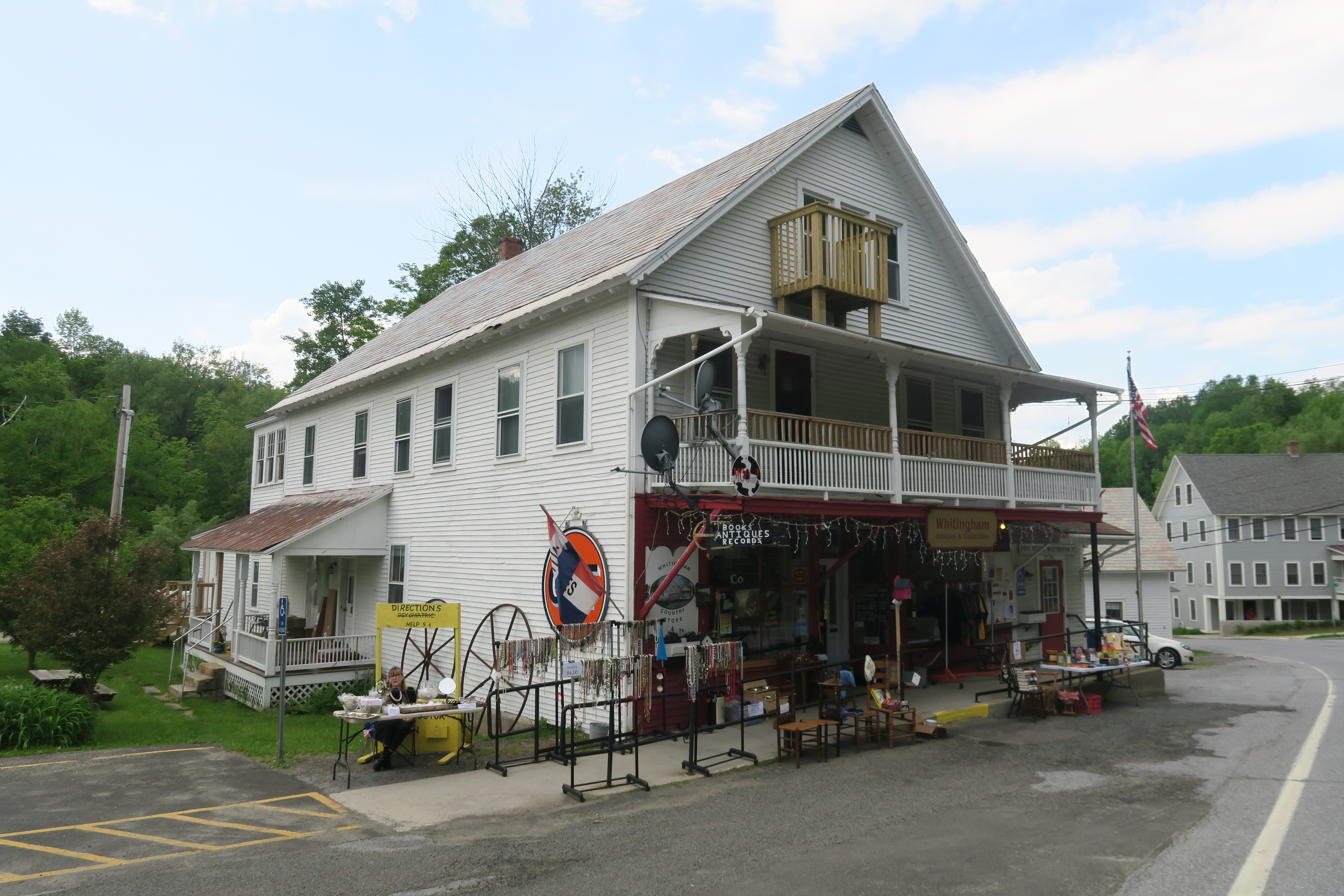
- Birthplace of Brigham Young, who was the First Governor of Utah Territory

- Seal

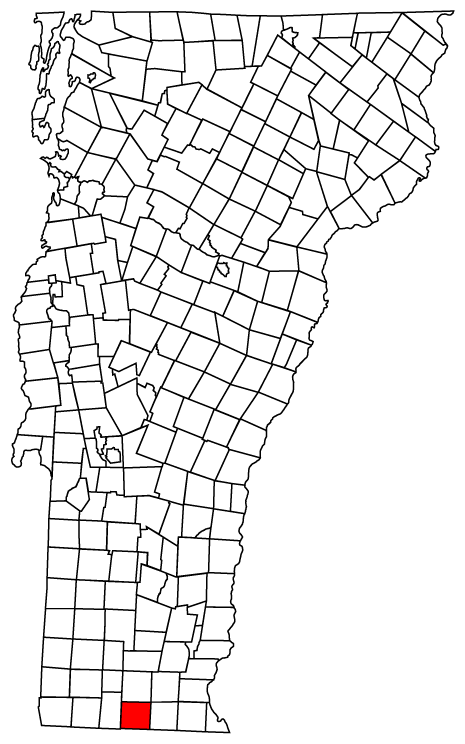
- Whitingham, Vermont
- Coordinates: 42°45′50″N 72°52′50″W coordinates_footnotes =
- Country: United States
- State: Vermont
- County: Windham
- Communities: Whitingham; Jacksonville

Area
  - Total: 39.3 sq mi (101.8 km^{2})
  - Land: 37.1 sq mi (96.0 km^{2})
  - Water: 2.2 sq mi (5.8 km^{2})
- Elevation: 1,903 ft (580 m)

Population (2020)
  - Total: 1,344
  - Density: 36/sq mi (14/km^{2})
- Time zone: UTC-5 (Eastern (EST))
  - Summer (DST): UTC-4 (EDT)
- ZIP Codes: 05361 (Whitingham); 05342 (Jacksonville)
- Area code: 802
- FIPS code: 50-83950
- GNIS feature ID: 1462261
- Website: whitinghamvt.org

Whitingham is a town in Windham County, Vermont, United States. The town was named for Nathan Whiting, a landholder. The population was 1,344 at the 2020 census. Whitingham is the birthplace of Brigham Young, the second president of LDS Church and founder of Salt Lake City, Utah. Its village center, a census-designated place, is also listed on the National Register of Historic Places as the Whitingham Village Historic District.

== Geography ==
According to the United States Census Bureau, the town has a total area of 39.3 square miles (101.8 km^{2}) of which 37.1 square miles (96.0 km^{2}) is land and 2.2 square miles (5.8 km^{2}) (5.70%) is water.

=== Climate ===
This climatic region is typified by large seasonal temperature differences, with warm to hot (and often humid) summers and cold (sometimes severely cold) winters. According to the Köppen Climate Classification system, Whitingham has a humid continental climate, abbreviated "Dfb" on climate maps.

== Demographics ==
Historical population
Census	Pop.	Note	%±
1790	442		—
1800	868		96.4%
1810	1,248		43.8%
1820	1,397		11.9%
1830	1,477		5.7%
1840	1,391		−5.8%
1850	1,380		−0.8%
1860	1,372		−0.6%
1870	1,263		−7.9%
1880	1,240		−1.8%
1890	1,191		−4.0%
1900	1,042		−12.5%
1910	969		−7.0%
1920	811		−16.3%
1930	734		−9.5%
1940	789		7.5%
1950	816		3.4%
1960	838		2.7%
1970	1,011		20.6%
1980	1,043		3.2%
1990	1,177		12.8%
2000	1,298		10.3%
2010	1,357		4.5%
2020	1,344		−1.0%
U.S. Decennial Census

At the 2010 census, there were 1,357 people in the town. The population density was 34.53 per square mile (13.33/km^{2}). There were 918 housing units at an average density of 25.1 per square mile (8.4/km^{2}). The racial makeup of the town was 99.23% White, 0.08% African American, 0.31% Native American, and 0.39% from two or more races. Hispanic or Latino of any race were 0.69% of the population.

There were 515 households, of which 33.2% had children under the age of 18 living with them, 61.2% were married couples living together, 7.6% had a female householder with no husband present, and 27.8% were non-families. 22.1% of all households were made up of individuals, and 8.3% had someone living alone who was 65 years of age or older. The average household size was 2.52 and the average family size was 2.94.

25.3% of the population were under the age of 18, 6.7% from 18 to 24, 28.2% from 25 to 44, 27.3% from 45 to 64, and 12.5% who were 65 years of age or older. The median age was 39 years. For every 100 females, there were 97.9 males. For every 100 females age 18 and over, there were 98.4 males.

The median household income was $37,434, and the median family income was $45,500. Males had a median income of $30,590 versus $25,188 for females. The per capita income for the town was $21,904. About 5.9% of families and 7.9% of the population were below the poverty line, including 11.5% of those under age 18 and 7.4% of those age 65 or over.

== Notable people ==
- Arthur P. Carpenter (1867–1937), U.S. Marshal of the US District Court for the District of Vermont
- Harrie B. Chase (1889–1969), judge of the United States Court of Appeals for the Second Circuit
- Paul A. Chase (1895–1963), justice of the Vermont Supreme Court
- Henry W. Closson (1832–1917), U.S. Army brigadier general
- Isaac Goodnow (1814–1894), founder of Kansas State University and Manhattan, Kansas
- Karen Hein (born 1944), pediatrician and founder of the first HIV/AIDS program for adolescents
- James Mullett Jr. (1784–1858), judge of the New York Supreme Court
- Horace B. Smith (1826–1888), U.S. Representative from New York
- Brigham Young (1801–1877), early leader of the Mormon Church
