= Bullhead =

Bullhead may refer to:

== Fish ==
- Certain sculpins, including:
  - European bullhead, Cottus gobio
  - Siberian bullhead, Cottus poecilopus
  - Norway bullhead, Taurulus Liljeborgi
  - Japanese fluvial sculpin or Japanese bullhead, Cottus pollux
- Catfish of the genus Ameiurus, including:
  - Black bullhead, Ameiurus melas
  - Brown bullhead, Ameiurus nebulosus
  - Yellow bullhead, Ameiurus natalis
- Catfish of the genus Pseudobagrus, including:
  - Dianchi bullhead, Pseudobagrus medianalis
  - Korean bullhead, Tachysurus fulvidraco (syn. Pseudobagrus fulvidraco)
  - Black bullhead, Pseudobagrus koreanus; see List of freshwater fishes of Korea § Catfish
- Other catfish, including:
  - African bullhead, Lophiobagrus cyclurus
  - King's bullhead, Liobagrus kingi
- Bullhead sharks
- Bullhead triplefin, Trianectes bucephalus
- Bullhead minnow, Pimephales vigilax

== Places ==
- Bullhead City, Arizona
- Bullhead, South Dakota
- Bullhead Dam, on the Colorado River between Arizona and Nevada

== Other uses ==
- Bullhead (album), by the Melvins
- Bullhead (film), a 2011 Belgian film by Michaël R. Roskam with Matthias Schoenaerts
- Bullhead rail, a particular cross-section of rail used in railway track construction
- The Bull's Head (Barnes), a London music venue formed in 1959 as a jazz club
- Bullheading, placing a column of heavy fluid into a well bore to prevent the flow of reservoir fluids from the well
- Tamiya Bullhead, a toy
- USS Bullhead (SS-332), the last US Navy ship sunk by enemy action during World War II
- Nexus 5X, an Android device with the codename bullhead
- Bull-headed shrike, passerine bird of eastern Asia

== See also ==
- Cow head (disambiguation)
- Bucephalus (disambiguation) (literally "ox head")
- Bucephala (disambiguation)
- Calf Head, rocky headland of South Georgia Island
