= Gromov =

Gromov (Russian: Громов) is a Russian male surname, its feminine counterpart is Gromova (Громова).

Gromov may refer to:

- Alexander Georgiyevich Gromov (born 1947), Russian politician and KGB officer
- Alexander Gromov (born 1959), Russian science fiction writer
- Alexey Gromov (born 1960), Russian politician
- Boris Gromov (born 1943), Soviet general, military commander in Afghanistan and Governor of Moscow Oblast
- Dmitri Gromov (figure skater) (born 1967), Russian figure skater
- Dmitri Gromov (ice hockey) (born 1991), Russian ice hockey player
- Feliks Gromov (1937–2021), Russian admiral, commander in chief Russian Navy (1992–1997)
- Kirill Gromov (born 1990), Russian ice hockey defenceman
- Maxim Gromov (born 1973), Russian political dissident
- Mikhail Gromov (disambiguation)
  - Mikhail Leonidovich Gromov (born 1943), French-Russian mathematician
  - Mikhail Mikhailovich Gromov (1899–1985), Russian aviator
- Nikolai Gromov (footballer) (1892–1943), Russian football player

Gromova may refer to:

- Lyudmila Gromova (born 1942), Russian artistic gymnast
- Mariya Gromova (born 1984), Russian synchronized swimmer
- Maria Gromova (swimmer) (born 1988), Russian backstroke and relay swimmer
- Serafima Gromova (1923–2013), engineer, Hero of Socialist Labour
- Ulyana Gromova (1924–1943), Hero of the Soviet Union
- Vera Gromova (1891–1973), Russian paleontologist
- Zhanna Gromova (born 1949), Russian figure skating coach
