= Vladimir Kozhin =

Russian businessman and politician

- Владимир Кожин
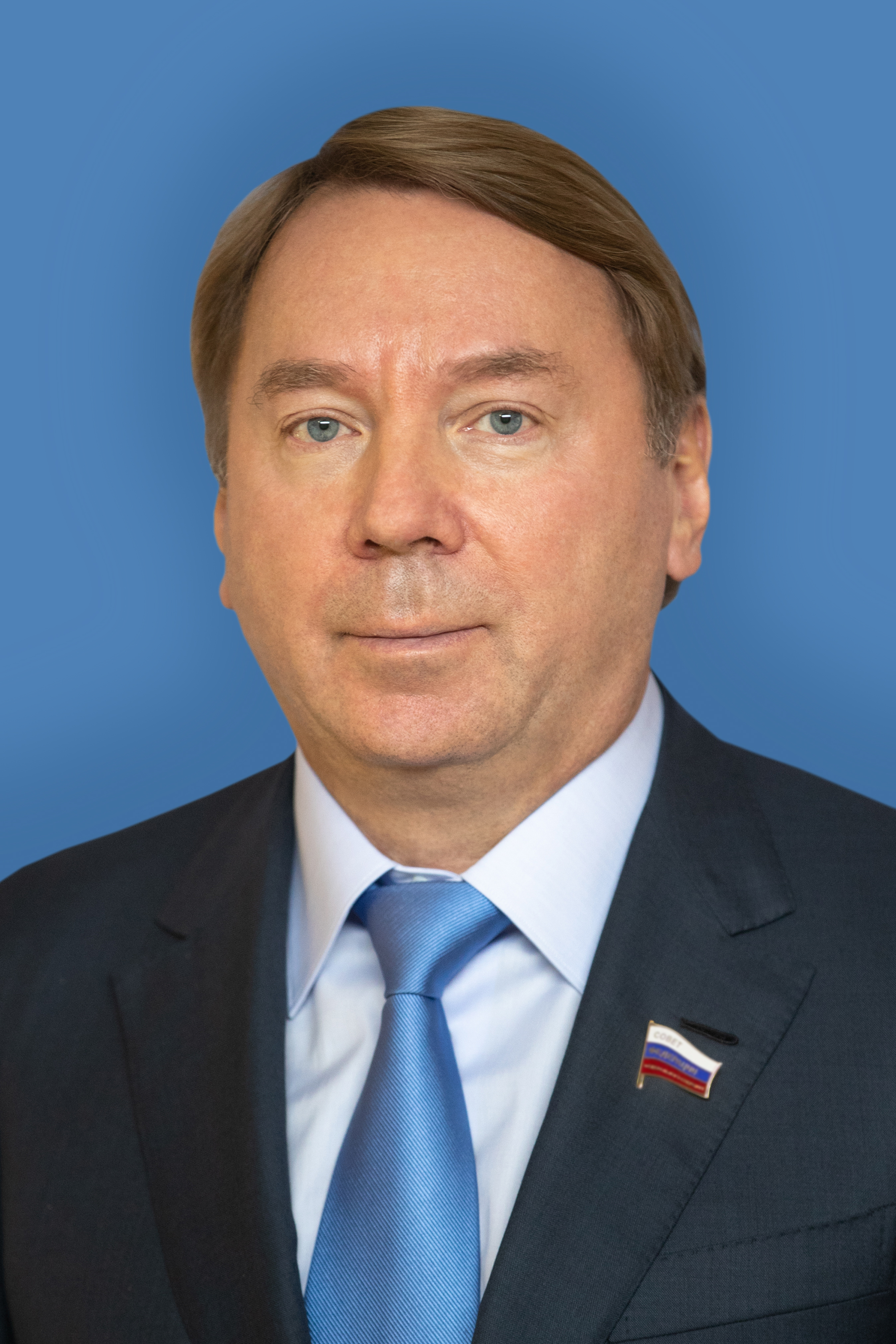
- Official portrait, 2018

Russian Federation Senator from Moscow
- Incumbent
- Assumed office 19 September 2018 Serving with Inna Svyatenko
- Preceded by: Vladimir Dolgikh

Personal details
- Born: Vladimir Igorevich Kozhin; 28 February 1959 (age 67) Troitsk, Chelyabinsk Oblast, Russian SFSR, Soviet Union
- Party: United Russia

Vladimir Igorevich Kozhin (Russian: Влади́мир И́горевич Ко́жин, born 28 February 1959) is a Russian businessman and politician, and senator from Moscow since 2018. Previously he was an Aide to the President of Russia and head of the Control Directorate of the Presidential Administration of Russia. He has the federal state civilian service rank of 1st class Active State Councillor of the Russian Federation.

== Political career ==
In March 1993, he became the Director General of the Saint Petersburg Association of Joint Ventures. From October 1994 until September 1999, he was the Chief of the Northwestern Center of the Federal Directorate for Currency and Export Control of Russia. From 20 September 1999 until 12 January 2000, he led the Russian Federal Service for Currency and Export Control (VEK).

Since 12 January 2000, Kozhin has been the Head of the Presidential Property Management Department of the Russian Federation, appointed by President Vladimir Putin. In 2008, President Dmitry Medvedev appointed him as a member of the Presidential Executive Office.

In 2010, Kozhin was suggested to succeed chucked out Yury Luzhkov as the Mayor of Moscow.

Since 2018, a member of the Federation Council from Moscow. If Sergey Sobyanin wins the mayoral election in the fall of 2023, he will retain his post.

== Sanctions ==
On 20 March 2014, the Office of Foreign Assets Control (OFAC) published that Kozhin and 19 other men have been added to the Specially Designated Nationals List (SDN), a list of individuals sanctioned as “members of the Russian leadership’s inner circle.”

== Honours and awards (selection) ==
- Order of Holy Prince Daniel of Moscow 3rd class (2002)
- State Prize of the Russian Federation (2003; for his efforts on the renovation of the Constantine Palace in Strelna as a new presidential residence)
- Order "For Merit to the Fatherland" 2nd class (2006); 4th class (2009)
- Order of Alexander Nevsky (2014)

== References and notes ==
Political offices
Preceded by Oleg Pavlov	Chief of the Russian Federal Service for Currency and Export Control; 20 September 1999 – 12 January 2000	Succeeded by Alexander Gromov
Preceded by Pavel Borodin	Head of the Russian Presidential Property Management Department; 12 January 2000 – present	Incumbent
