= Haystack Mountain (Vermont) =

Mountain in Vermont, United States

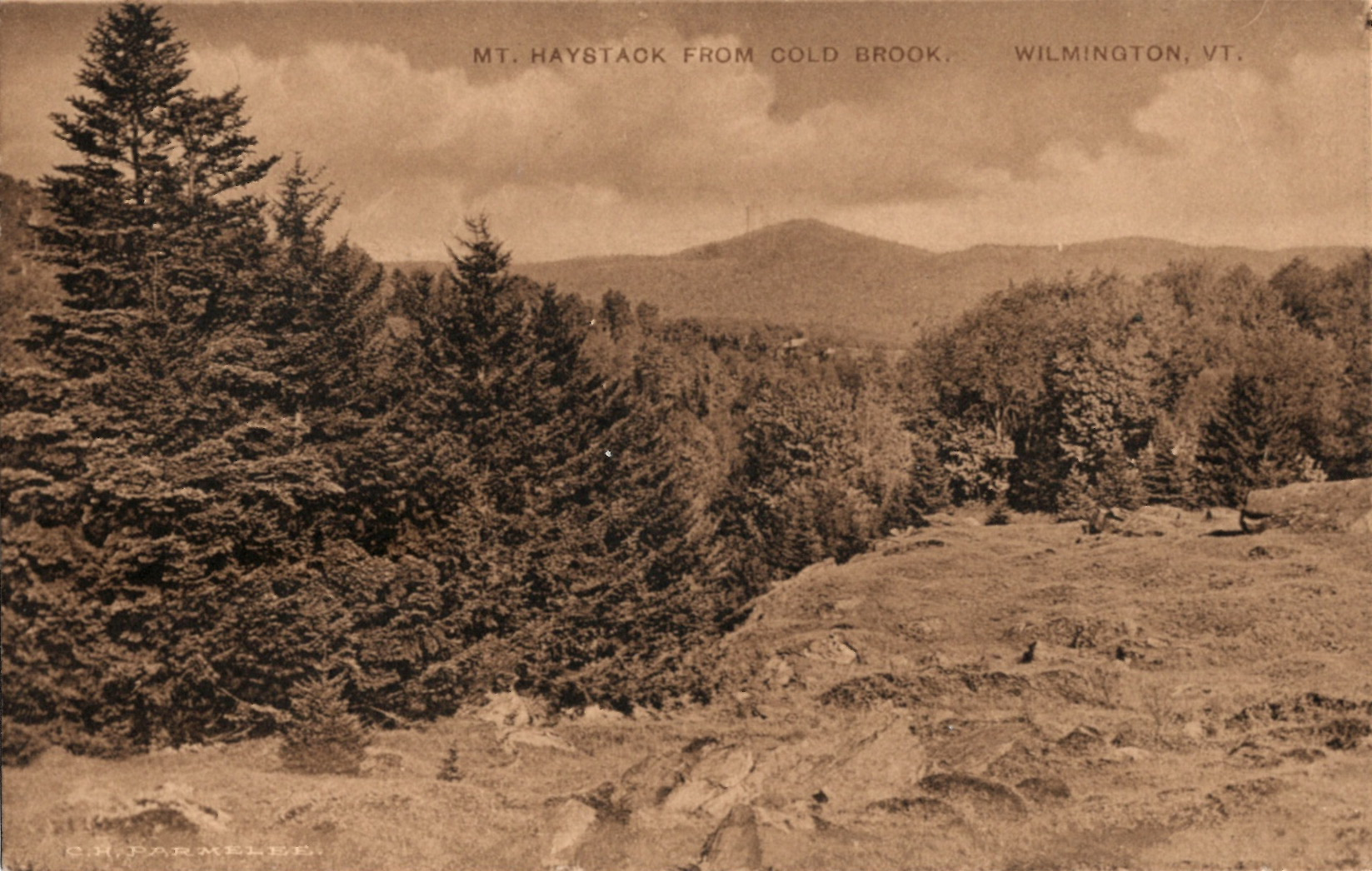
- Haystack Mountain as seen from Cold Brook

Highest point
- Elevation: 3,445 ft (1,050 m)
- Prominence: 384 ft (117 m)
- Coordinates: 42°54′50″N 72°55′10″W

Geography
- Location: Wilmington, Vermont, U.S.
- Parent range: Green Mountains

Climbing
- Easiest route: Hiking trail

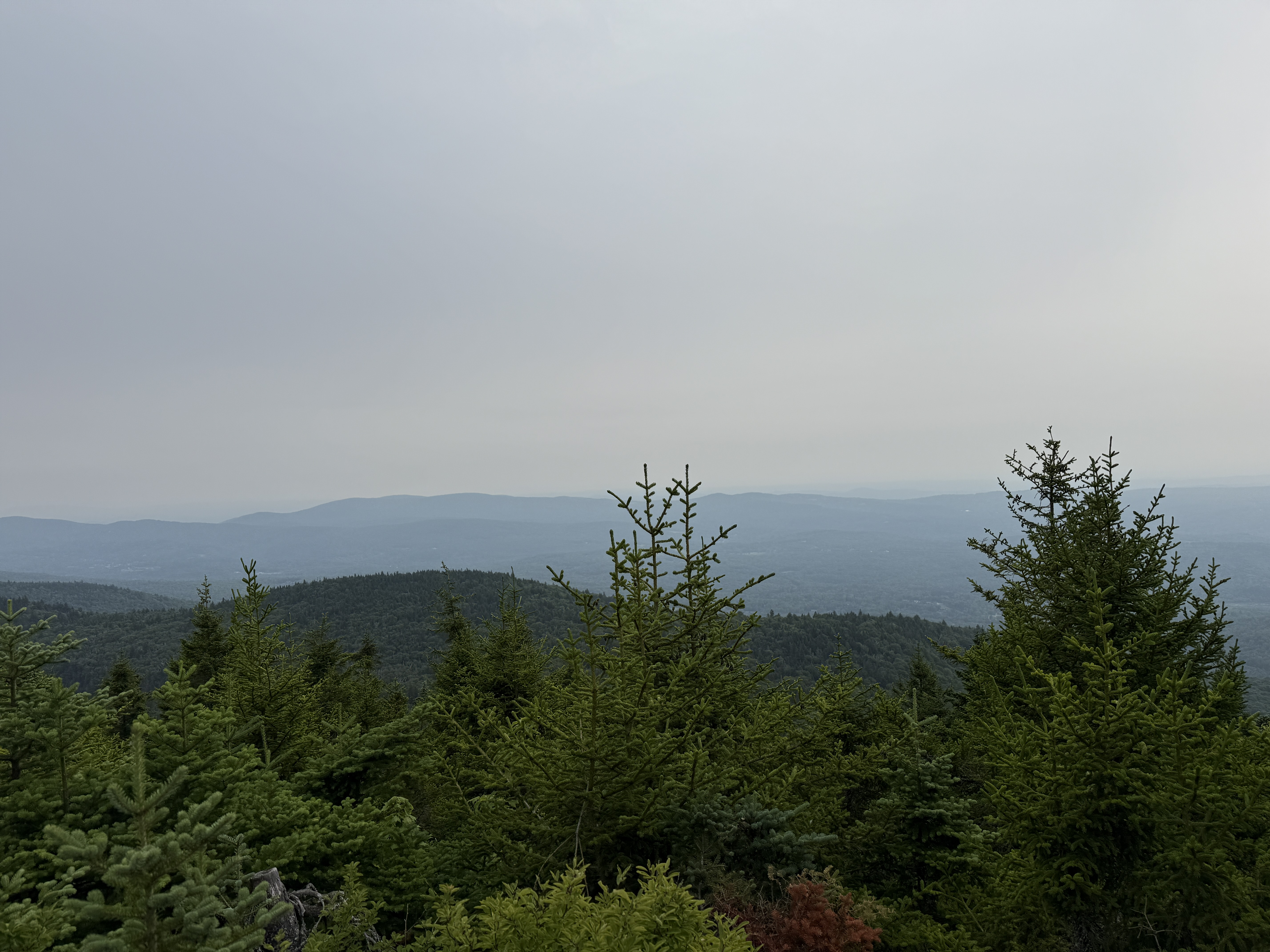
View from summit of Haystack Mountain

Haystack Mountain is located in Wilmington, Vermont, and is part of the Green Mountains mountain range. It has a summit of 3,445 feet (1,049 m) and shares a ridgeline with neighboring Mt. Snow to the north. Haystack is “[a] mountain with a sharp summit cone and a broad, deep lake just under the precipitous peak. The view is a wide and complete panorama.” According to the 2015 Wilmington Municipal Plan, “Haystack Mountain and the ridgeline which forms the spine of the Green Mountain National Forest are prominent landforms. They provide a dramatic scenic impact from many viewpoints in Wilmington. Haystack Mountain boasts numerous hiking trails to the summit, capturing a broad vista of the valley below.” In his 1861 report, Edward Hitchcock described Haystack Mountain as, “one of the wildest, most rugged, and imposing peaks in Southern Vermont.”

"Just below the peak of Haystack Mountain, at an elevation of 2,984 feet, lies 36 acre Haystack Pond. Surrounded by wetlands, this pristine pond is accessible only by a hiking trail. Its mountainside location makes it a scenic treasure, whether viewed from the summit or the shore. Nearby is three acre Crystal Pond, now enclosed by woods and also surrounded by wetlands." Binny Brook connects Haystack Pond to Crystal Pond, and then flows down Haystack Mountain, emptying to Harriman Reservoir.

Haystack Pond does not support aquatic life due to its acidity. Core samples taken from the pond suggest it had a pH of 5.2-5.3 from 1700-1925. This correlates with several failed attempts to stock the pond with fish in the late 1800s. The pond went through rapid acidification from 1925-1970 to ~pH of 4.9 due to acid rain from sulfur emissions. It has since returned to previous levels.

Haystack Mountain Ski Area is on the northeast flank of Haystack Mountain, on 834 acres. Chimney Hill, a housing development with several hundred homes, is on the lower southeast flank. The foothills of the Chimney Hill development include the Haystack Golf Course, which is open to the public. The remaining, and majority of Haystack Mountain is part of the Green Mountain National Forest. Hiking trails are available to the public from the Chimney Hill development to the peak. Another trail skirts the west ridge of the summit, around Haystack pond, to the ridgeline trail which leads to the summit of Mt Snow.
