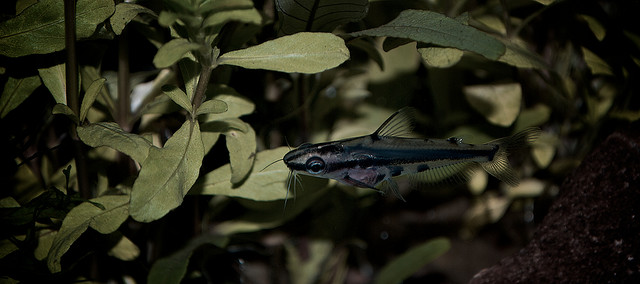
- Pelteobagrus ornatus

Scientific classification
- Kingdom: Animalia
- Phylum: Chordata
- Class: Actinopterygii
- Order: Siluriformes
- Family: Bagridae
- Genus: Pelteobagrus; Bleeker, 1865

= Pelteobagrus =

Genus of fishes

Pelteobagrus is a doubtful genus of bagrid catfishes found in eastern Asia. The taxonomy of this genus is unclear and many authorities treat it as a junior synonym of Tachysurus and the type species of the genus, is Silurus calvarius which is a synonym of Tachysurus sinensis.

== Species ==
The following species have been in Pelteobagrus at some point:

- Pelteobagrus argentivittatus (Regan, 1905); valid as Tachysurus argentivittatus
- Pelteobagrus brashnikowi (Berg, 1907); valid as Tachysurus brashnikowi
- Pelteobagrus crassilabris (Günther, 1864); valid as Tachysurus crassilabris
- Pelteobagrus crassirostris (Regan, 1913); valid as Tachysurus crassirosris
- Pelteobagrus eupogon (Boulenger, 1892); valid as Tachysurus eupogon
- Pelteobagrus fui (Miao, 1934); valid as Tachysurus fui
- Pelteobagrus fulvidraco (Richardson, 1846); valid as Tachysurus sinensis Lacepède, 1803
- Pelteobagrus intermedius (Nichols & Pope, 1927); valid as Tachysurus intermedius
- Pelteobagrus kyphus (Mai, 1978); valid as Tachysurus kyphus
- Pelteobagrus mica (Gromov, 1970); valid as Tachysurus mica
- Pelteobagrus microps (Rendahl, 1933); valid as Tachysurus microps
- Pelteobagrus nitidus (Sauvage & Dabry de Thiersant, 1874); valid as Tachysurus nitidus
- Pelteobagrus nudiceps (Sauvage, 1883); valid as Tachysurus nudiceps
- Pelteobagrus ornatus (Duncker, 1904); valid as Hyalobagrus ornatus
- Pelteobagrus ransonnettii (Steindachner, 1887); valid as Tachysurus aurantiacus (Temminck & Schlegel, 1846)
- Pelteobagrus tenuifurcatus (Nichols, 1931); valid as Tachysurus tenuifurcatus
- Pelteobagrus tonkinensis Nguyen, 2006; valid as Tachysurus tonkinensis
- Pelteobagrus ussuriensis (Dybowski, 1872); valid as Tachysurus ussuriensis
- Pelteobagrus vachellii (Richardson, 1846); valid as Tachysurus vachellii
- Pelteobagrus virgatus (Oshima, 1926); valid as Tachysurus virgatus
- Pelteobagrus wangi (Miao, 1934); species inquirenda in Tachysurus
- Pelteobagrus wittenburgii (Popta, 1911); valid as Tachysurus sinensis Lacepède, 1803

FishBase currently shows two valid species in this genus, P. eupogon and P. tonkinensis.
