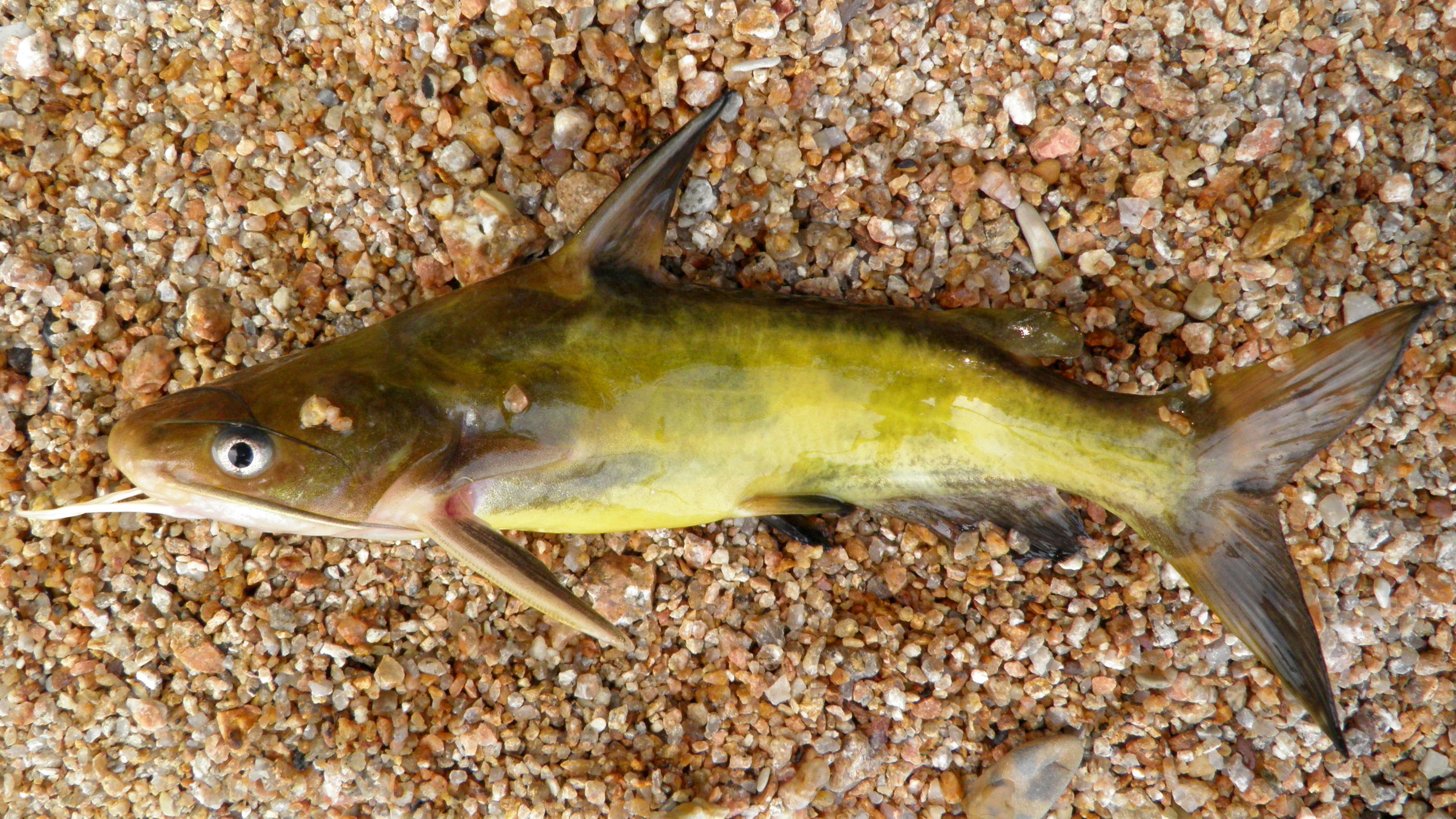

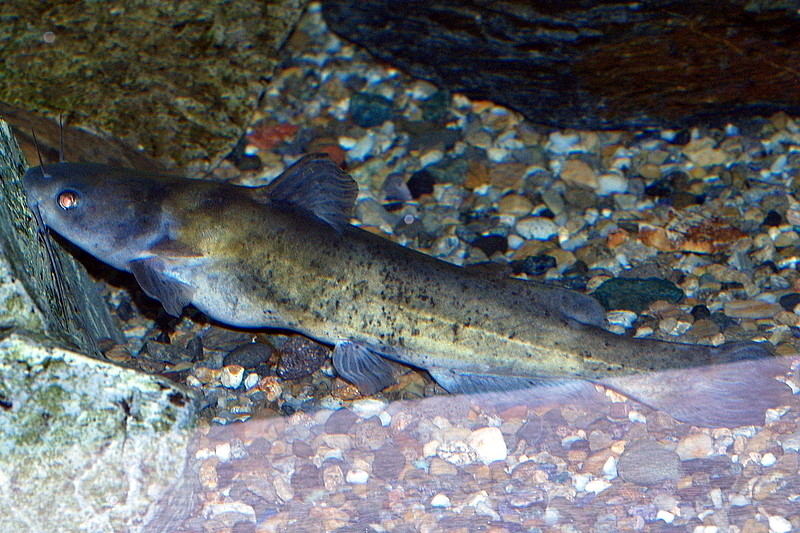
- The two extant species fulvidraco at top, and nudiceps

Scientific classification
- Kingdom: Animalia
- Phylum: Chordata
- Class: Actinopterygii
- Division: Teleostei
- Order: Siluriformes
- Family: Bagridae
- Genus: Pseudobagrus; Bleeker, 1858

= Pseudobagrus =

Pseudobagrus Temporal range: Middle Miocene

Genus of fishes

Pseudobagrus is a genus of bagrid catfishes that inhabit streams and rivers throughout East Asia. These species fossils were found in Japan. The two Coreobagrus species, C. brevicorpus and C. ichikiwai, are both treated in some recent literature as valid in Pseudobagrus. It has been noted that Pelteobagrus may not be monophyletic if species placed in Pseudobagrus and Coreobagrus were excluded. The taxonomy of this genus is unclear and many authorities treat it as a junior synonym of Tachysurus.

Pseudobagrus species are small- to mid-sized bagrid catfishes. These fish all have an inferior mouth; narial openings widely separated; four pairs of barbels; top of head covered by skin in most species; two dorsal fin spines; pelvic fin small; and caudal fin emarginate, truncate or round.

== Species ==
All recognized extant species in this genus and its synonyms Coreobagrus and Pelteobagrus are now listed in Tachysurus.

The fossil species, †Pseudobagrus ikiensis Watanabe & Uyeno, 1999 is known from the Middle Miocene of Japan. This species was described as being morphologically close to the extant Tachysurus fulvidraco and indistinguishable from the extant Tachysurus nudiceps.
