= Ski area =

Skiable area linking several distinct ski resorts

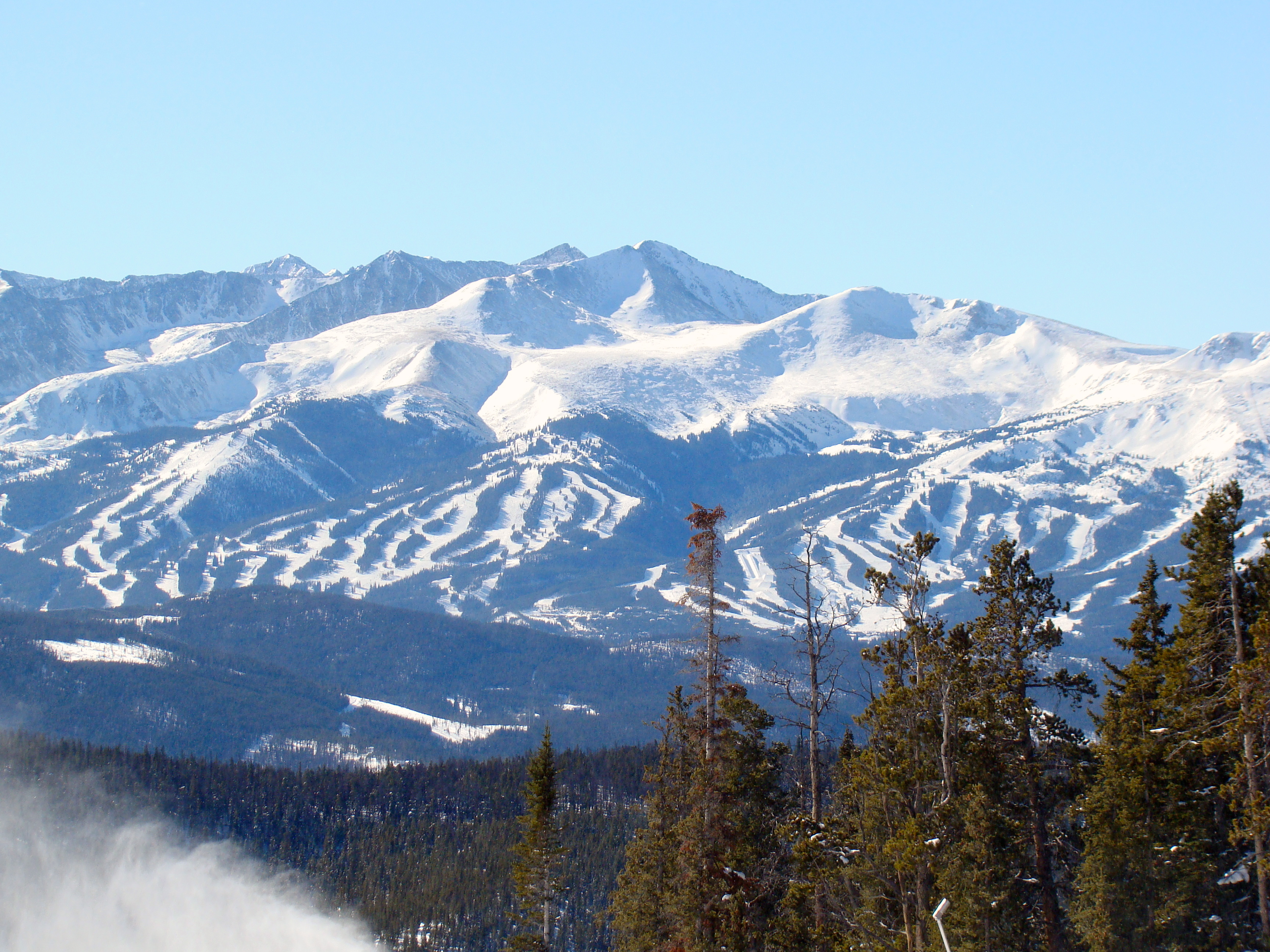
View of Breckenridge ski area (USA)

A ski area is the terrain and supporting infrastructure where skiing and other snow sports take place. Such sports include alpine and cross-country skiing, snow boarding, tubing, sledding, etc. Ski areas may stand alone or be part of a ski resort.

== Scope of activities ==
The US Forest Service defines a ski area as: "a site and associated facilities that has been primarily developed for alpine or Nordic skiing and other snow sports, but may also include, in appropriate circumstances, facilities necessary for other seasonal or year-round natural resource-based recreation activities, provided that a preponderance of revenue generated by the ski area derives from the sale of alpine and Nordic ski area passes and lift tickets, revenue from alpine, Nordic, and other snow sport instruction, and gross revenue from ancillary facilities that support alpine or Nordic skiing and other snow sports."

== Notable examples ==
Ski areas can extend over several municipalities (ex: La Plagne in France, Alta Badia in Italy, etc.) or several countries (ex: Portes du Soleil in France and Switzerland). A municipality can have several ski areas (ex: Chamonix-Mont-Blanc in France, Davos in Switzerland, Kitzbühel in Austria, etc.). The largest ski areas connect several ski resorts (ex: Les Trois Vallées in France).

== Business models ==
Alpine ski areas require substantial capital investment, a significant labor force, and maintenance of an infrastructure that provides dining and retail services to skiers and that assures reliable snow that is appealing to skiers in locations that are accessible to them. Consequently, they require a fee structure and ancillary attractions that provide the revenue to sustain them economically. The natural settings of ski areas require the management of their environmental impacts, according to legal standards. The profession of ski area management requires specialized training in degree programs. Specialities include the maintenance of the lift and trail infrastructure and the management of the supporting commercial enterprises that rent and sell skis and that provide food services.

== See also ==
- List of ski areas and resorts
- Private ski area (North America)
