= Haystack Mountain Ski Area =

Ski area in Vermont, United States

Hermitage Club at Haystack Mountain
- Interactive map of Hermitage Club at Haystack Mountain
- Location: Wilmington, Vermont, US
- Coordinates: 42.9226028°N 72.8945694°W
- Vertical: 1,400
- Trails: 48
- Longest run: Outcast
- Lift system: 1 six passenger heated bubble (Barnstomer, 2015), 2 Quads (Stag's Leap, The Tage), 1 Triple (The Witches)
- Snowmaking: 90% Non-Gladed Trails
- Website: Hermitage Club at Haystack Mountain

The Hermitage Club at Haystack Mountain is a private, member-owned club that provides alpine skiing on Haystack Mountain in Wilmington, Vermont to its members.

== The ski area ==
The ski area comprises three major sections: the lower mountain, upper mountain, and The Witches. The lower mountain is entirely beginner terrain. The upper mountain has intermediate and advanced terrain. The Witches is advanced terrain except for an intermediate run down the west (or “back”) side.

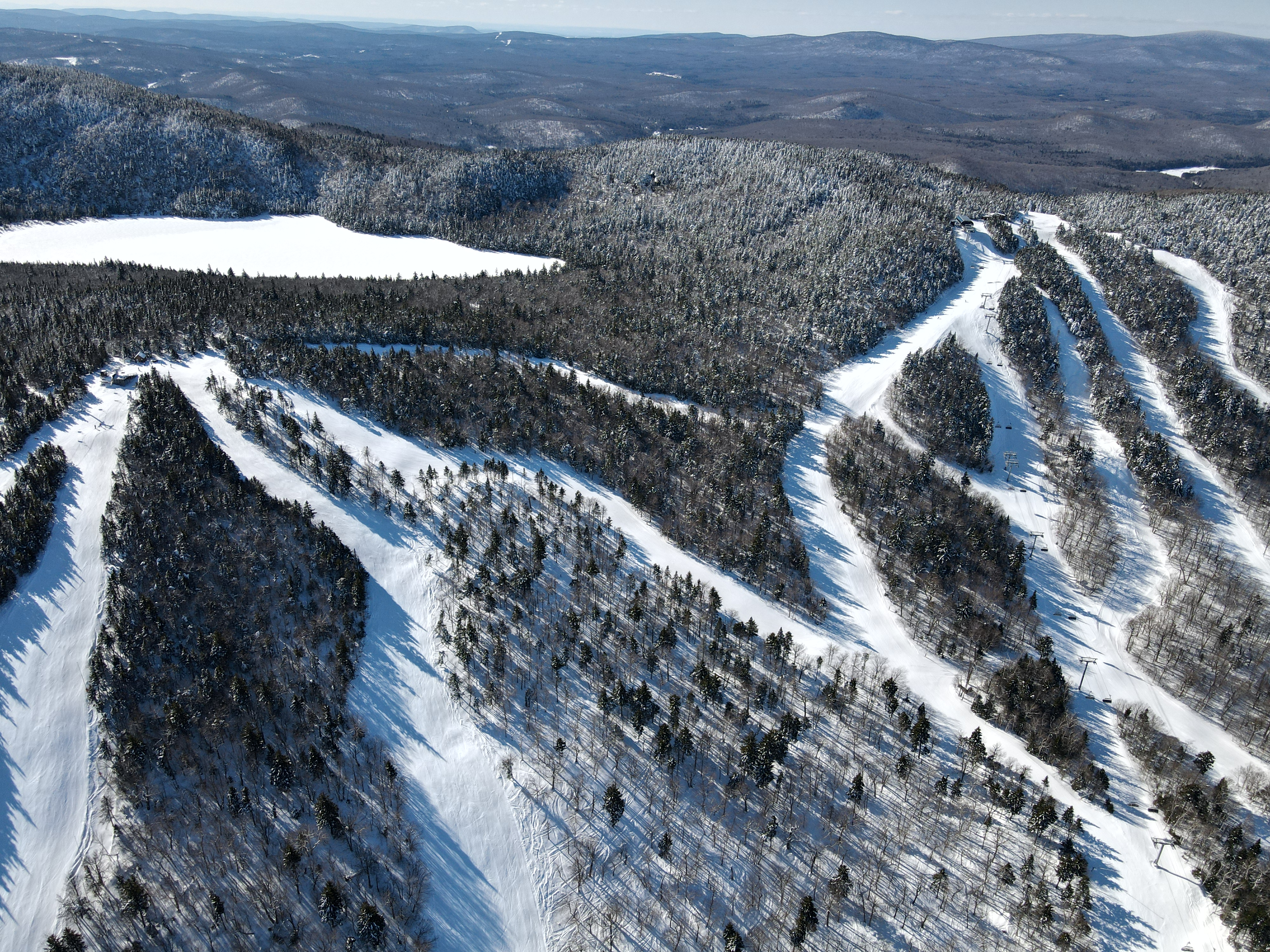
Haystack ski area showing The Witches and Barnstormer upper terminals, and Haystack Pond

The ski area's largest lift, The Barnstormer, is a Doppelmayr six-person, detachable lift, with a protective bubble. The Barnstormer serves the upper mountain, and takes skiers from the clubhouse to the summit of Haystack Mountain. The Tage lift, a Skytrac quad, on the north side of the ski area, brings skiers from the Hermitage Inn to the upper mountain. The Stags Leap lift, also a Skytrac quad, serves the lower mountain and connects the lower mountain to the upper mountain, with an optional mid-point exit at the top of the lower mountain. The Witches lift, a CTEC triple, serves The Witches area of the mountain.

Members have access to an 80,000-ft^{2} clubhouse with a bar, restaurant, game room, bowling alley, and movie theatre. The clubhouse also includes a spa, gym, and lockers for members to keep ski equipment. There is a 2,700 ft^{2} mid-mountain cabin, with a 900 ft^{2} wrap-around porch, and a restaurant and bar.

== History ==
Alpine skiing on Haystack Mountain has been offered through a range of different approaches.

- 1964–2005 Public ski area
  - 1964–1981 Independently operated (Haystack Corp / AMI)
  - 1981–1985 Closed
  - 1985–1991 Independently operated (The Haystack Group)
  - 1991–2005 Operated by Mount Snow (leased 1991–1994, purchased in 1994)
- 2005–present Private ski club
  - 2005–2011 Closed (privately owned, but never opened)
  - 2011–2018 Operated under Jim Barnes' ownership
  - 2018–2020 Closed (chapter 7 bankruptcy proceedings)
  - 2020–present Member owned and operated

=== Public ski area (1964–2005) ===
==== Independently operated (1964–1991) ====
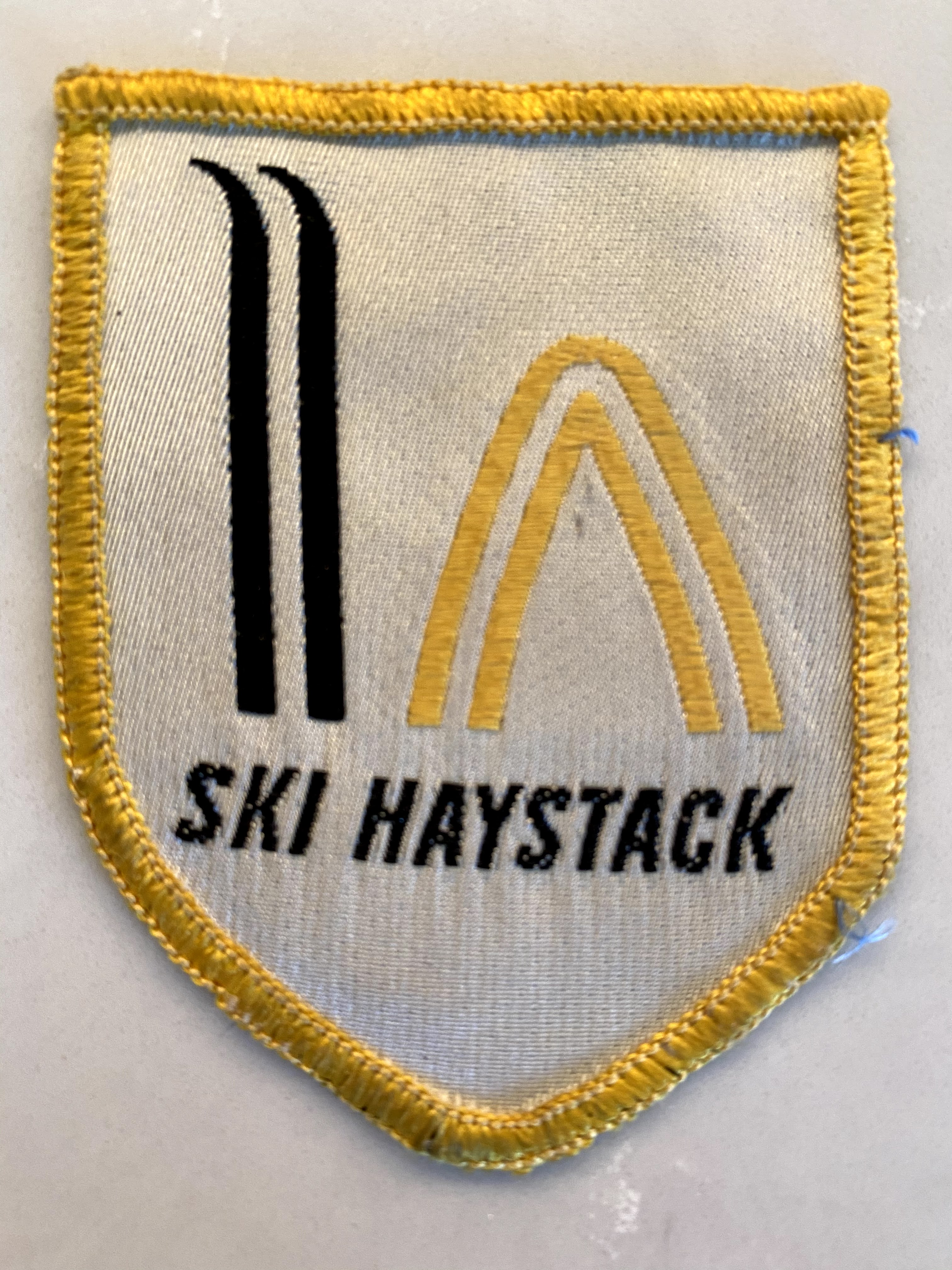
Embroidered patch from the late 1960s

Haystack Mountain Ski Area was first opened to the public in December 1964, by the Haystack Corporation. The area provided access to 76 acres of trails and slopes. The mountain had 4 T-bars servicing the lower mountain novice area with a three-story base lodge, called “The Stack,” at the top of the novice area. The Stack was, “designed in the jet-set style of the day, with an elaborate ski shop, cafeteria, dining room, cocktail lounge and a wine and cheese shop.” The ski area's president, Herbert Hart, was quoted as saying, “All the brains of the area were pooled to come up with an answer on how they could have a wine shop and bar under the same roof. You aren’t supposed to have both. The solution was simple. The cork is pulled from the wine bottles as they are sold. The wine is consumed on the premises.” The upper mountain had a 2,700 foot double chairlift which took skiers halfway to the summit. Three buses—Root, Toot, and Wisle—took skiers between The Stack and bottom of the upper mountain chair lift. Jack Manton was the general manager, and Bruce Gavett was in charge of the ski school with Bob McCafferty as his assistant. Bill Colombo was the manager of engineering.

During the 1965 ski season, the Haystack Corp. added a 5,600 ft long chairlift that took skiers all the way to the peak, opening up new trails, and bringing the trail count to 18. A nursery for young children ages 3 to 7 was also added. Dick McLernon, the area's PR director, said in 1965 the area had broken all previous records for December gross income, “Business started increasing the day after Christmas and became better each day. Wednesday was our biggest day, but even so it was only about 65 per cent of our record day last March when we had more than 10,000 people here. A good weekday crowd here is about 3,000 and the weekend crowd averages between eight and ten thousand.” At the time the area offered a family weekend ticket for $38, and a $30 weekend package which included two lessons a day.

A 1960s ski area map, archived by New England Ski History project, shows the lower mountain trails as Haymaker, Pitchfork, Skid Row, Fanny Hill, Cascade, and Tunnel. The upper mountain trails as Flying Dutchman, Hayseed, Shaft, Needle, Last Straw, Rocker, 007, Haywire, Outcast, Upper Dutchman, Avalanche, Last Chance, The Stump Jumper, and The Oh Noooooo.

In May 1966, E. H. Lord-Wood Associates of Hartford, CT presented the master plan design and rendering for the ski area at a local town meeting. The Brattleboro Reformer described the plan as, “encompassing the entire Haystack development in a central village, includes a hotel, theater, shops, lodges, motels, clubs and various year round recreational facilities.

In July 1966, Jack Manton was replaced as the area's GM by William Palumbo. Manton returned to his real estate business in New Jersey but continued in his role as vice president and development manager of Haystack Before the 1966 ski season opened, an 1,800 foot transfer lift was added to transport skiers from the lodge to lifts at the base of the upper mountain. The cocktail lounge in the base lodge was expanded as well.

In 1968, Haystack was recognized for their work teaching the handicap to ski, and as one of the first ski areas to teach the blind to ski. As the Brattleboro Reformer tells it, a Sunday school teacher asked Gavett if she could bring her class to ski Haystack, but noted one of the boys in the class, Chris Peppel, was blind. Gavett was undeterred and had his ski instructors prepare by skiing the mountain blindfolded. Peppel was able to ski the entire mountain with an instructor as a guide. As their expertise in this area grew, they hired Jim Gardner, an amputee, as a ski instructor. As a result, Haystack had seven blind, four deaf, and five amputee skiers regularly skiing the mountain. Gardner lauded Gavett for his selfless work in this area. Throughout Gavett's time at Haystack he was recognized many times for his success with making skiing accessible to everyone, regardless of ability.

In 1969, William Thomas (W. T.) Cullen joined the ranks of Haystack Corp. Cullen had been president of Chimney Hill Corp., the 700-acre (280 ha), 700-lot vacation home development adjacent Haystack Mountain. Cullen believed Haystack's success was hampered by the lack of overnight accommodations and restaurants near Haystack, especially as compared with Mt. Snow. Under Cullen's leadership, the corporation completed an 18-hole golf course in 1971, and sold $11M in property between 1970 and 1973.

In 1971, Palumbo resigned as Haystack GM to work full time for Mueller Skilift Corp. He had been distributing and installing lifts for Mueller on a part-time basis while at Haystack. Gavett was promoted to GM to replace him.

In the late 60s, Vermont started paying closer attention to the rapid expansion of land use in the state. This eventually led to the passage of Act 250, putting a microscope on Haystack's growth plans. While many lots had been sold, both Haystack and the Chimney Hill developments' sewers and water lines had not yet been completed. Plans previously approved by the town were called into question. This was made more complex when existing sewer work was halted because Haystack's primary lender and mortgage holder, Associated Mortgage Investors (AMI), entered bankruptcy proceedings. Several lawsuits followed, including one accusing the Haystack Corporation of misrepresenting the development's progress. This led to AMI taking over operations of Haystack in 1974, eventually putting it into bankruptcy in 1976.

The ski area continued operations through bankruptcy and receivership. In 1979, the Tri-Mountain Leisure Group (TLG) leased and then operated Haystack Ski Area. TLG also owned Roundtop ski area in northern VT. TLG operated it through the 1980/1981 season, but with Roundtop also struggling, and no credible offers on the table for Haystack Ski Area, AMI was forced to shut it down.

The area remained closed until 1985 when Don Tarinelli and a group of investors formed The Haystack Group and bought the area and its assets for $850,000. Don Tarinelli was the former president of the Stratton Mountain Ski Area and had retired to nearby Jamaica, VT. The Haystack group spent an estimated $7 million updating and repairing the ski area. They replaced two double chairs with new triple lifts, and invested more than $1 million in snowmaking infrastructure. The Haystack Group also expanded the ski area's footprint by adding a CTEC triple lift to the eastern side of the mountain—an area they called the Witches. This new section added three new advanced trails named Gandolf, Merlin, and Cauldron. The Haystack Group also started a new condominium community near Chimney Hill called Spyglass Village. While these improvements upgraded the ski experience, the ski resort could not attract enough skiers to overcome the debt from the large infrastructure investments, and so filed for Chapter 11 bankruptcy protection in September 1991. 44,000 skiers visited Haystack during 1990–1991 ski season—the last it would be an independently operated public ski area.

==== Mount Snow operated (1991–2005) ====
Shortly after the bankruptcy filing, the court granted Haystack's motion to allow nearby Mount Snow to lease its properties for three years at $312,000 per year, with the option to purchase the resort for $2.5 million. Haystack's largest creditor, The Marble Bank, was owed more than $4M, and called the plan, "woefully inadequate," suggesting the sale price undervalued Haystack. While deliberation on the bankruptcy reorganization terms continued in court, the lease moved forward. Mt. Snow took over the operation of Haystack, renaming the resort, "Haystack at Mount Snow." The two mountains were promoted together, with trail counts and snow reports often combined.

During the three-year lease, Mount Snow went through a contentious permitting process for an 2.8 mile, 18" water pipeline from Haystack's Mirror Lake snowmaking reservoir to Mount Snow. Even Governor Howard Dean weighed in on the controversy, angering some. On October 1, 1993, Mount Snow received the permit necessary for the pipeline.

On October 21, 1993, the judge dismissed Haystack's bankruptcy case citing incomplete financial disclosures as evidence that the assets should not continue to be run under current management. So working directly with the bank, on June 22, 1994, S-K-I Ltd. acquired Haystack for $4.35M.

In 1996 S-K-I Ltd. merged with LBO Resort Enterprises, forming the American Skiing Company. The American Skiing Company (ASC) would soon hit financial troubles, resulting in the scaling back of operations at Haystack. By the end of its ownership of Haystack, ASC limited operations to weekend and holiday periods.

=== Private mountain ski resort (2005–present) ===
==== The Haystack Club, Robert Foisie (2005–2011) ====
On June 27, 2005, a group of investors led by Robert Foisie, purchased the Haystack Ski Area from ASC for $5 million. Foisie planned to develop a private member-only resort that included ski, golf, and other amenities. The project was marketed under the name The Haystack Club. Foisie planned to invest $450 million into the resort, adding full snowmaking capabilities, new lifts, and ample real estate offerings. David Dillion, the president of the Vermont Ski Areas Association, was hired as the president of the new venture. A gatehouse was added at the entry to the resort and the existing base lodge was gutted. The club planned for 900 members, with 200 members as the initial goal. Only 50–60 were sold—the price of membership was never disclosed. In early 2007, the project was put on hold and employees laid-off. There is no evidence the ski area ever opened. In September 2007, the group applied for an Act 250 master plan permit, which could give potential partners additional detail on the vision. The project now included Bob Rubin as an executive VP. The plan included two 80+ unit condominiums, a 162 unit hotel with restaurant, and 118 townhomes. The results of the permit application were not available.

==== The Hermitage Club, Jim Barnes (2011–2018) ====
In 2011, Jim Barnes, purchased the ski area and the adjacent golf course for $6.5 million. Barnes had purchased the nearby Hermitage Inn in 2007. Barnes rebranded the club, The Hermitage Club at Haystack Mountain, and the golf course, The Hermitage Golf Course. The Hermitage Club first opened for the 2012–2013 ski season.

Barnes expanded the amenities provide by the ski area:

- In November 2012, a building was added to the base of the upper mountain to be used by the mountain ski patrol and restrooms for members, necessary for it to operate for the 2012–2013 season.
- Two buildings were added to the summit to be used as a warming hut and additional ski patrol office.
- Approximately 20 single family homes and condos were built and sold between 2011 and 2014.
- Mirror Lake, the water reservoir for snow making, was enhanced to allow for summer recreation in 2014.
- Between August 2012 (broke ground) and January 2015 (opening) a clubhouse was built at the base of the upper mountain. It was approximately 80,000 sq. ft. and included facilities for members (gym, spa, video game room for kids, lockers for ski equipment, food services, etc.).
- The Barnstormer, the lift from the base of the upper mountain, to the peak of the upper mountain, was upgraded to a new high speed six person lift with a protective bubble manufactured by Doppelmayr. The lift uses 22 lift towers, travels 5,236 feet to the summit, and has 88 detachable chairs. The new lift more than halved the time to the summit. The lift was opened on January 2, 2016, and reportedly cost $7.5M.

The TV show, The Bachelor, filmed four episodes at the Club that were aired during the 2018 Winter Olympics.

In 2015, the Vermont Attorney General's Office and other governmental agencies filed a lawsuit against the club. The group allegedly performed construction activities without land use permits, performed construction activities without a storm water permit, constructed a building without a wastewater and potable water supply permit and disturbed a wetland without approval.

Barnes ran into financial difficulties in 2018. In February 2018, Berkshire Bank initiated bankruptcy proceedings as Barnes failed to meet his obligation to make payments on three loans. Following this, in March 2018, the Vermont Department of Taxes shut down the club due to non-payment of taxes. On July 26, 2019, a Vermont judge granted a motion Friday to convert the bankruptcy case to a Chapter 7 liquidation allow for a sale of the club's assets to move forward, thus ending Jim Barnes ownership of the club.

Civil lawsuits followed, include one accusing Barnes of fraud and seeking to recoup more than $2 million for townhouses that were never built.

==== The Hermitage Club, member owned (2020–present) ====
On March 20, 2020, a group of 181 former members purchased the club and associated assets at auction for $8.06 million. The purchase included the ski mountain, ski lifts, clubhouse, the Haystack Golf Course, several inns and some undeveloped parcels of land. The member group outmatched multiple competing bids including those from a real estate development firm headquartered in California and a Michigan-based ski resort operator. The member owners formed a non-profit owning entity, Hermitage Members Group (HMG), which describes itself as "a member-owned entity established to own and operate the Hermitage Club as a private, four-season, family-friendly ski resort on Haystack Mountain."

Bill Benneyan led the club reopening and then day-to-day operations from 2020-2025.

The club is run by a volunteer board. Josh DeBottis is the executive director and general manager as of the 2025/2026 season. HMG sold assets purchased in the auction that were not critical to the ski experience:

- Haystack Golf Course was sold to John Cleanthes in June 2020
- Doveberry Inn was sold to Tim Ryan in June 2020
- Snow Goose Inn was sold to Cheryl and Jon Parker in 2020
- Horizon Inn was sold to Jennifer Betit-Engel and Christian Engel in October 2020
- Hermitage Inn was sold to Tim Hall and Mary Lou Ricci in April 2021
- The Hayfever lift, a Poma triple, was dismantled and sold to Bousquet Mountain in Pittsfield, Massachusetts.

The club re-opened for the 2020–2021 ski season.

Jeff Koslowsky: Served as the inaugural board president from 2020 to 2021. Chris Croft: Served as president from 2021 to 2023. Stuart Kovensky: Held the presidency from 2023 to 2024. Megan (McDonald) Hodgson: Has been serving as president from 2024 to the present.

As of December 2025, membership had grown to over 400 members.
