= Cow head =

Cow head or ox head may refer to the head of a cow, or to a head (individual animal) of cattle. It may also refer to:

- Cow Head (town), a town in the Canadian province of Newfoundland and Labrador
- Cow Head Group, a geologic group in Newfoundland and Labrador
- Cow head protests, which occurred in Selangor, Malaysia in 2009
- Gozu ("Cow Head"), a Japanese urban legend

- Gozu, or Yakuza Horror Theatre: Cow's Head, a 2003 Japanese film directed by Takashi Miike

- Álvar Núñez Cabeza de Vaca, explorer whose Spanish surname means "cow head"
- Japanese eagle ray, also known as Cowhead eagle ray

== China ==
- Ox-Head and Horse-Face, two types of underworld guardians in Chinese mythology
- Oxhead school, school of Chan Buddhism
- Niutou River (literally "cow head river"), a river in Gansu
- Niushoushan (literally "cow head mountain"), historical Buddhist mountain near Nanjing

== See also ==
- Bullhead (disambiguation)
- Bucephalus (disambiguation) (literally "ox head")
- Bucephala (disambiguation)
- Gozu (disambiguation)
- Calf Head, rocky headland of South Georgia Island
- Tête de veau, calf's head as a European dish
