= P. bucephala =

P. bucephala may refer to:

- Phalera bucephala, the buff-tip, a moth species found throughout Europe
- Phylliroe bucephala, a synonym for Phylliroe bucephalum, a species of pelagic parasitic nudibranch

== See also ==
- Bucephala (disambiguation)
