= Tachysurus omeihensis =

Scientific classification
- Kingdom: Animalia
- Phylum: Chordata
- Class: Actinopterygii
- Division: Teleostei
- Order: Siluriformes
- Family: Bagridae
- Genus: Tachysurus
- Species: T. omeihensis

Binomial name
- Tachysurus omeihensis (Nichols, 1941)

Synonyms
- Leiocassis omeihensis Nichols, 1941; Pseudobagrus omeihensis (Nichols, 1941)

Species of fish

Tachysurus omeihensis is a species of fish classified into the family Bagridae, included at order Siluriformes.

== Distribution ==
The fish lives in the region of O-mei Hsien, China.

== Bibliography ==
- Eschmeyer, William N., ed. 1998. Catalog of Fishes. Special Publication of the Center for Biodiversity Research and Information, No. 1, Vol. 1–3. California Academy of Sciences. San Francisco, California, United States. 2905. ISBN 0-940228-47-5.
- Fenner, Robert M.: The Conscientious Marine Aquarist. Neptune City, New Jersey, United States : T.F.H. Publications, 2001.
- Helfman, G.; B. Collette; D. Facey (1997). The diversity of fishes. Malden, Massachusetts, United States: Blackwell Science.
- Moyle, P.; J. Cech (2000). Fishes: An Introduction to Ichthyology (4th ed.). Upper Saddle River, New Jersey, United States: Prentice-Hall.
- Nelson, Joseph S.; Grande, Terry C.; Wilson, Mark V. H. (2016). Fishes of the World (5th ed.). Hoboken: John Wiley and Sons. doi:10.1002/9781119174844. ISBN 978-1-118-34233-6.
- Wheeler, A. (1985). The World Encyclopedia of Fishes (2nd ed.). London: Macdonald.
