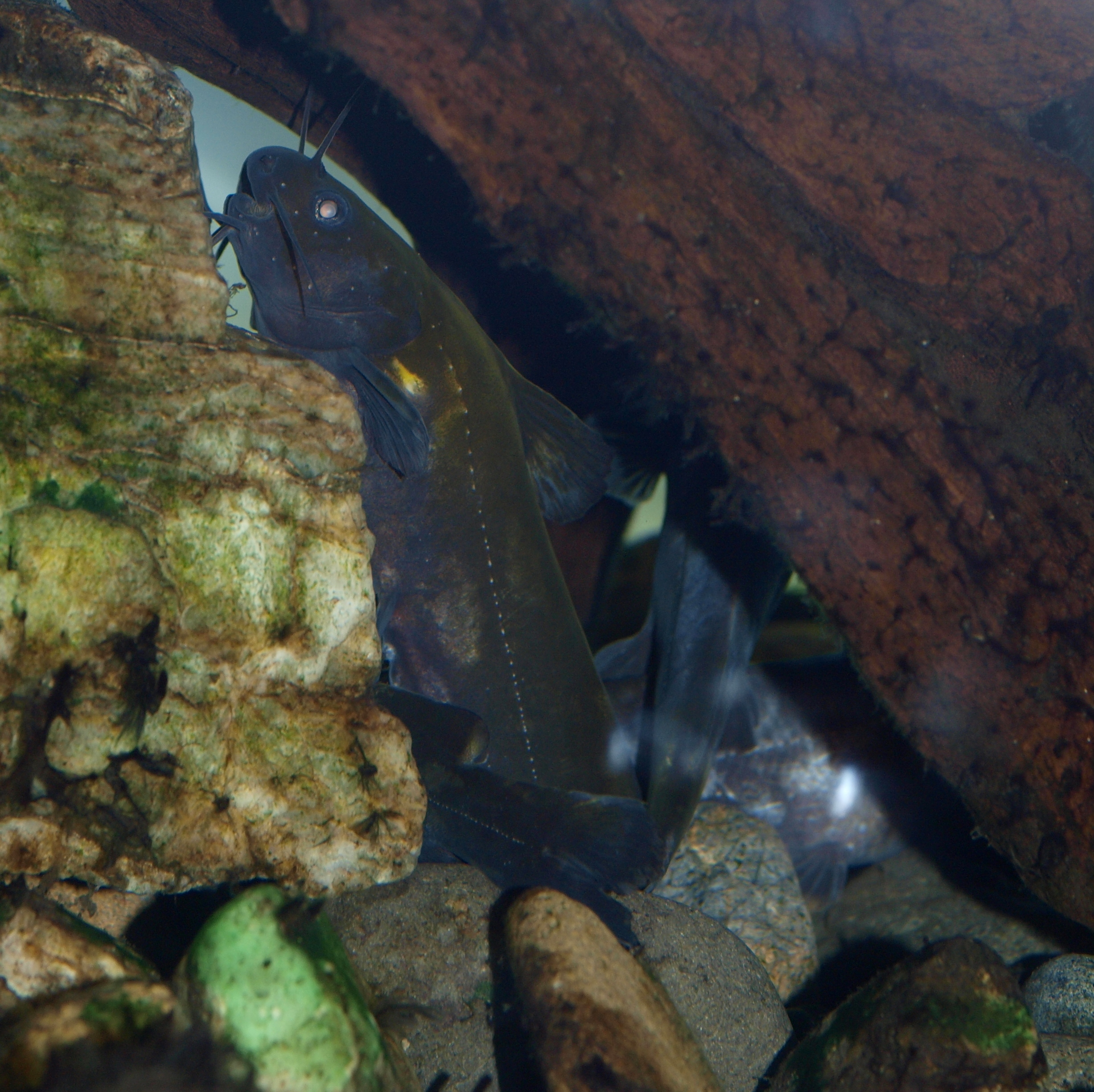

Conservation status
- Vulnerable (IUCN 3.1)

Scientific classification
- Kingdom: Animalia
- Phylum: Chordata
- Class: Actinopterygii
- Order: Siluriformes
- Family: Bagridae
- Genus: Tachysurus
- Species: T. ichikawai

Binomial name
- Tachysurus ichikawai (Okada & Kubota, 1957)

Synonyms
- Coreobagrus ichikawai Okada & Kubota, 1957; Pseudobagrus ichikawai (Okada & Kubota, 1957)

= Nekogigi =

Species of fish

Nekogigi (Tachysurus ichikawai) is a species of bagrid catfish endemic to Japan where it is only found in Mie Prefecture on Honshu. It occurs in streams and can grow to a length of 10.8 cm (4.3 in).
