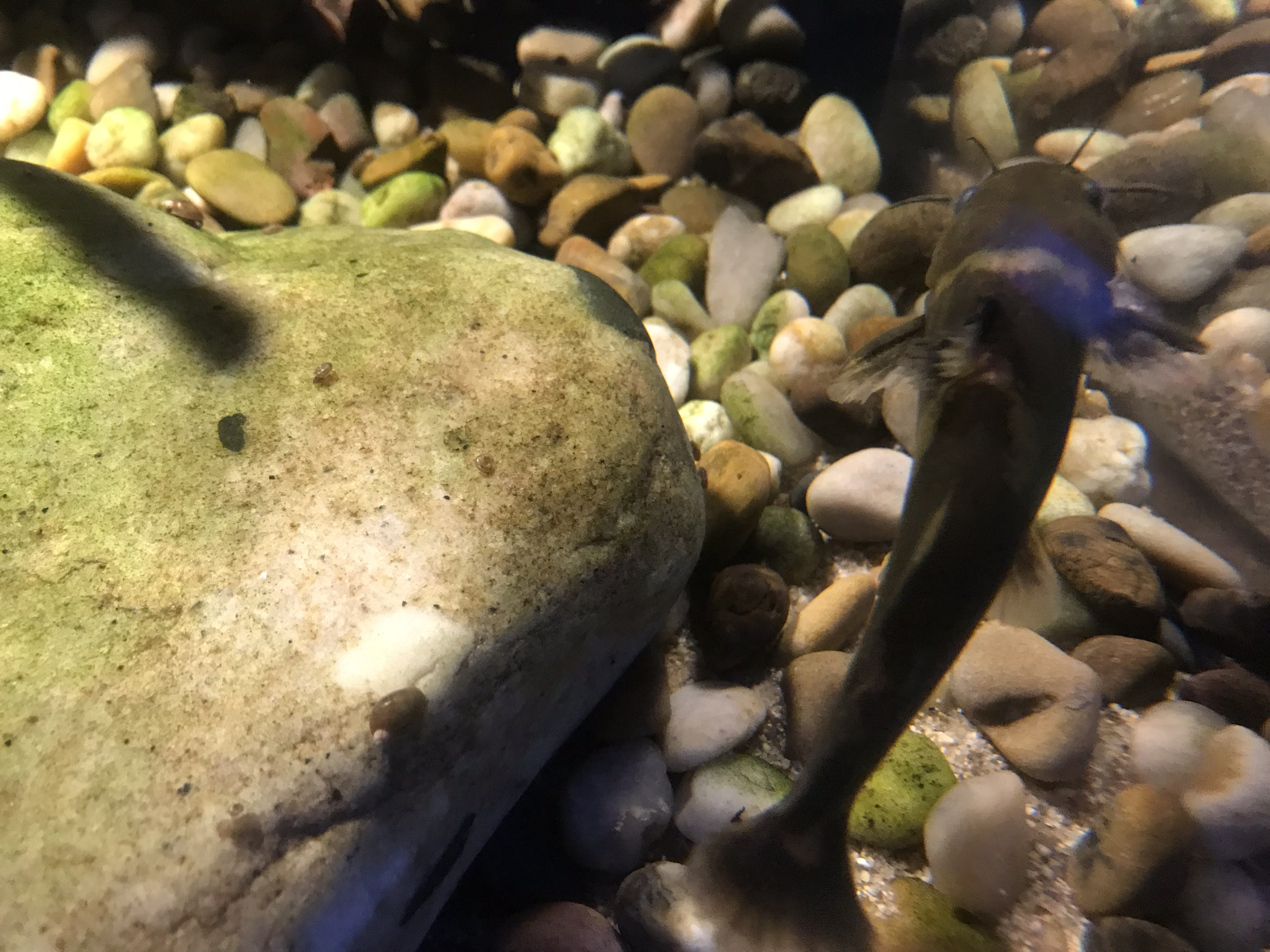

Conservation status
- Vulnerable (IUCN 3.1)

Scientific classification
- Kingdom: Animalia
- Phylum: Chordata
- Class: Actinopterygii
- Order: Siluriformes
- Family: Bagridae
- Genus: Tachysurus
- Species: T. brevicorpus

Binomial name
- Tachysurus brevicorpus (Mori, 1936)

Synonyms
- Coreobagrus brevicorpus Mori, 1936; Pseudobagrus brevicorpus (Mori, 1936)

= Tachysurus brevicorpus =

Species of fish

Tachysurus brevicorpus (common name - Korean stumpy bullhead) is a species of bagrid catfish endemic to Korea, where it is found in the Nakdong River catchment. It occurs in freshwater and can grow to a length of 9.2 cm (3.6 in).

The species was first described in 1936 by Tamezo Mori, and has a single dorsal spine, six dorsal soft rays, one anal spine, and 12-14 anal soft rays, no scales on its body and relatively large eyes. It is found in clear waters areas with large stones and pebbles on the bottom, where it mainly feeds on the larvae of aquatic insects. It is nocturnal and its spawning season is believed to be from June to July.

It is listed as "vulnerable" on the IUCN threatened species list. and as a natural monument of South Korea (designated March 17, 2005)
