= Wilmington Village Historic District =

Historic district in Vermont, United States

- U.S. National Register of Historic Places
- U.S. Historic district
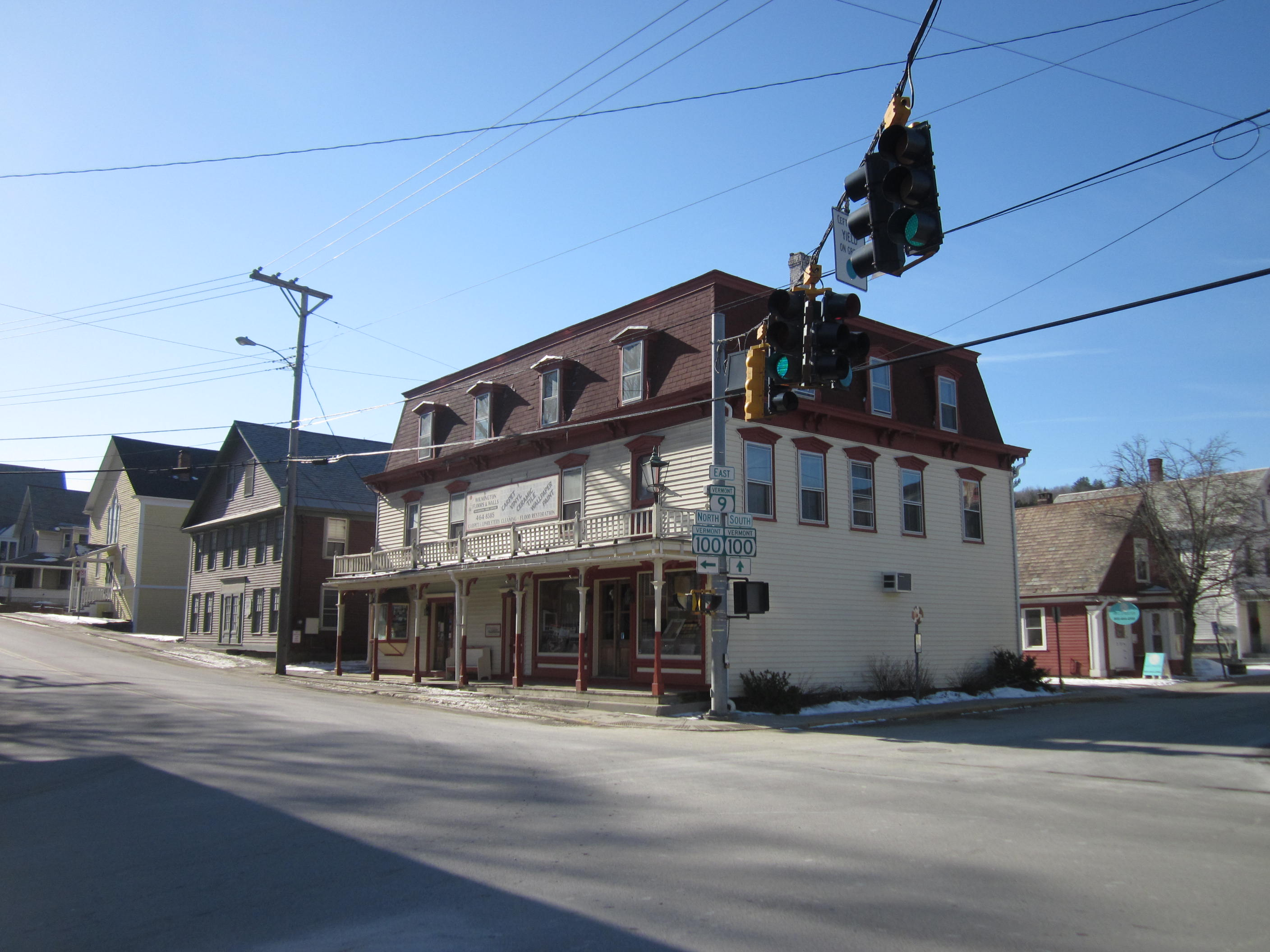

- Location within Vermont Location within the United States
- Location: VT 9 and VT 100, Wilmington, Vermont
- Coordinates: 42°52′9″N 72°52′30″W
- Area: 45 acres (18 ha)
- Architectural style: Greek Revival, Late Victorian, Colonial Revival
- NRHP reference No.: 80000389
- Added to NRHP: August 11, 1980

The Wilmington Village Historic District encompasses a significant portion of the village center of Wilmington, Vermont. The village grew as a crossroads industrial center through the mid-19th century, and experienced relatively little growth afterward. The district was listed on the National Register of Historic Places in 1980.

== Description and history ==
The town of Wilmington is located in rural southern Windham County, with its village center at the junction of Vermont Routes 9 and 100. Route 9 is the principal east-west route across southern Vermont, and Route 100 is the principal north-south route traversing the state on the eastern flank of the Green Mountains. The two roads meet at the North Branch Deerfield River, which historically provided the power for the village's industries. The historic district extends along Route 9 from Beaver Street in the east to the Valley Trail in the west, and along Route 100 from Beaver Street in the south to just beyond Lisle Hill Road in the north. The district has 59 historically significant buildings, and only five that are not. Most of these buildings were built in the 19th century, in vernacular versions of popular architectural styles. Particularly sophisticated buildings include the Crafts Inn and Memorial Hall, both turn of the 20th century buildings attributed to McKim, Mead & White.

The town of Wilmington was chartered in 1757, with a second conflicting charter issued in 1764. This delayed development of the town until the 1770s. The original town center was located on top of Lisle Hill, northeast of the present village, but was relocated when the confluence of stage routes and the river provided economic impetus for its move. Some of the village's buildings were physically moved as part of the transition. The stage route that became Route 9 was built through the area in 1831, and mills (none of which have survived) lined the river.

== See also ==
- National Register of Historic Places listings in Windham County, Vermont
