= Bucephalus (disambiguation) =

- Bucephalus (c. 355 BC – 326 BC) was Alexander the Great's horse

Bucephalus may also refer to:

- Bucephalus (brand), an ox-head branding mark anciently used on horses
- Bucephalus (racehorse), an 18th-century Thoroughbred racehorse
- Bucephalus (flatworm), a trematode flatworm genus
- Bucephalus Bouncing Ball (song), a song from the 1997 album "Come To Daddy" by Aphex Twin
- HMS Bucephalus, an early 19th-century English naval vessel — see also Invasion of Java (1811).
- The Crystal Bucephalus, an original 1994 Doctor Who novel written by Craig Hinton
- BTR-4 "Bucephalus", Ukrainian armored troop carrier

== See also ==
- Bucephala (disambiguation)
- Cow head (disambiguation)
- Bullhead (disambiguation)
