= Chimney Hill, Vermont =

Census-designated place in Vermont, United States

- Census-designated place
- Location within Vermont Location within the United States
- Coordinates: 42°52′56″N 72°54′03″W
- Country: United States
- State: Vermont
- County: Windham
- Town: Wilmington

Area
  - Total: 2.07 sq mi (5.37 km^{2})
  - Land: 2.07 sq mi (5.37 km^{2})
  - Water: 0 sq mi (0.0 km^{2})
- Elevation: 1,903 ft (580 m)

Population (2020)
  - Total: 263
- Time zone: UTC-5 (Eastern (EST))
  - Summer (DST): UTC-4 (EDT)
- ZIP Code: 05363 (Wilmington)
- Area code: 802
- FIPS code: 50-13860
- GNIS feature ID: 2807159

Chimney Hill is a census-designated place (CDP) in the town of Wilmington, Windham County, Vermont, United States. As of the 2020 census, it had a population of 263.

The CDP is in southwestern Windham County, in the western part of Wilmington. It is a residential area built on the southeastern slopes of Haystack Mountain and is bordered to the north and west by the Green Mountain National Forest. It is 3 miles (5 km) northwest of the village of Wilmington.
