= G. William Hamilton =

American politician (1933–2022)

George William Hamilton (March 23, 1933 – January 21, 2022) was an American politician and businessman.

Hamilton lived in Wilmington, Vermont, and was involved in the real estate business. He served in the Vermont House of Representatives and was a Republican.
