= Tachysurus brevianalis =

Conservation status
- Least Concern (IUCN 3.1)

Scientific classification
- Kingdom: Animalia
- Phylum: Chordata
- Class: Actinopterygii
- Division: Teleostei
- Order: Siluriformes
- Family: Bagridae
- Genus: Tachysurus
- Species: T. brevianalis

Binomial name
- Tachysurus brevianalis (Regan, 1908)

Synonyms
- Pseudobagrus brevianalis

Species of fish

Tachysurus brevianalis is a species of bagrid catfish endemic to Taiwan. First collected from Sun Moon Lake (the type locality), it is found in central and northern Taiwan, west of the Central Mountain Range. Based on the lack of morphological and genetic differences, it has been proposed that Tachysurus taiwanensis is a junior synonym of Tachysurus brevianalis, but this has not been followed by online databases.

Tachysurus brevianalis grows to 10 cm (3.9 in). It has been evaluated by IUCN and the 2012 Redlist of Fresh Water Fishes of Taiwan as a Least concern species.
