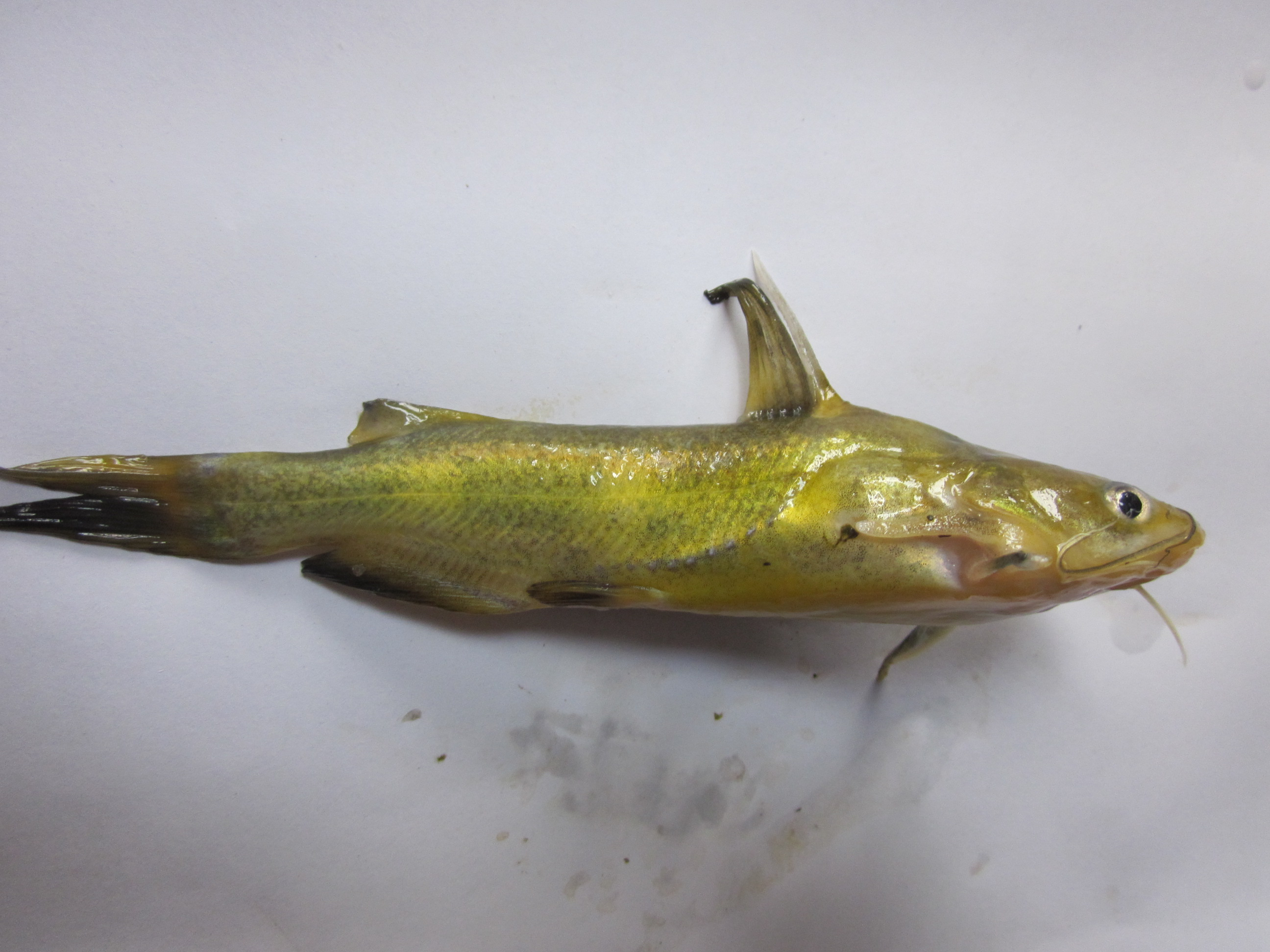
- Tachysurus fulvidraco

Scientific classification
- Kingdom: Animalia
- Phylum: Chordata
- Class: Actinopterygii
- Division: Teleostei
- Order: Siluriformes
- Family: Bagridae
- Genus: Tachysurus; Lacépède, 1803

Type species
- Tachysurus sinensis Lacépède, 1803

Synonyms
- Coreobagrus Mori, 1936; Fluvidraco Jordan & Fowler, 1903; Pelteobagrus Bleeker, 1864; Pseudobagrus Bleeker, 1858

= Tachysurus =

Genus of fishes

Tachysurus is a genus of bagrid catfishes found in eastern Asia and as a fossil in Africa. The currently recognized species in this genus are:

- Tachysurus adiposalis (Ōshima, 1919)
- Tachysurus albomarginatus (Rendahl, 1928)
- Tachysurus analis (Nichols, 1930)
- Tachysurus argentivittatus (Regan, 1905)
- Tachysurus aurantiacus (Temminck & Schlegel, 1846)
- Tachysurus brachyrhabdion (Cheng, Ishihara & Zhang, 2008)
- Tachysurus brashnikowi (Berg, 1907) - Brazhnikov's catfish
- Tachysurus brevianalis (Regan, 1908)
- Tachysurus brevicaudatus (Wu, 1930)
- Tachysurus brevicorpus (Mori, 1936) - Korean stumpy bullhead
- Tachysurus crassilabris (Günther, 1864)
- Tachysurus emarginatus (Regan, 1913)
- Tachysurus eupogon (Boulenger, 1892)
- Tachysurus flumendraco Chen, Liu & Yeh, 2024
- Tachysurus fui (Miao, 1934)
- Tachysurus fulvidraco (J. Richardson, 1846) - yellow catfish
- Tachysurus gracilis Jie Li, X. L. Chen & B. P. L. Chan, 2005
- Tachysurus herzensteini (Berg, 1907) - Herzenstein's catfish
- Tachysurus hoi (Pellegrin & Fang, 1940)
- Tachysurus ichikawai (Okada & Kubota, 1957) - Neko-gigi
- Tachysurus intermedius (Nichols & Pope, 1927)
- Tachysurus kaifenensis (T. L. Tchang, 1934)
- Tachysurus koreanus Uchida, 1990
- †Tachysurus landanensis Dartevelle and Casier, 1943 (fossil, Eocene of Zaire)
- Tachysurus lani Cheng, Shao, López & Zhang, 2021
- Tachysurus latifrontalis Shao & Zhang, 2022
- Tachysurus longibarbus (Cui, 1990)
- Tachysurus medianalis (Regan, 1904)
- Tachysurus mica (Gromov, 1970)
- Tachysurus microcrassirostris (Xiao, 2010)
- Tachysurus microps (Rendahl (de), 1932)
- Tachysurus nitidus (Sauvage & Dabry de Thiersant, 1874)
- Tachysurus nubilosus H. H. Ng & Freyhof, 2007
- Tachysurus nudiceps (Sauvage, 1883)
- Tachysurus omeihensis (Nichols, 1941)
- Tachysurus pratti (Günther, 1892)
- Tachysurus similis (Nichols, 1926)
- Tachysurus sinensis Lacépède, 1803 - Korean bullhead
- Tachysurus sinyanensis (Fu, 1935)
- Tachysurus spilotus H. H. Ng, 2009
- Tachysurus taeniatus (Günther, 1873)
- Tachysurus taiwanensis (Oshima, 1919)
- Tachysurus tenuifurcatus (Nichols, 1931)
- Tachysurus tenuis (Günther, 1873)
- Tachysurus tokiensis Döderlein (de), 1887
- Tachysurus trilineatus (C. Y. Zheng, 1979)
- Tachysurus truncatus (Regan, 1913)
- Tachysurus vachelli (Richardson, 1846)
- Tachysurus virgatus (Ōshima, 1926)
- Tachysurus wuyueensis Zhou, Yuan & Shao, 2024

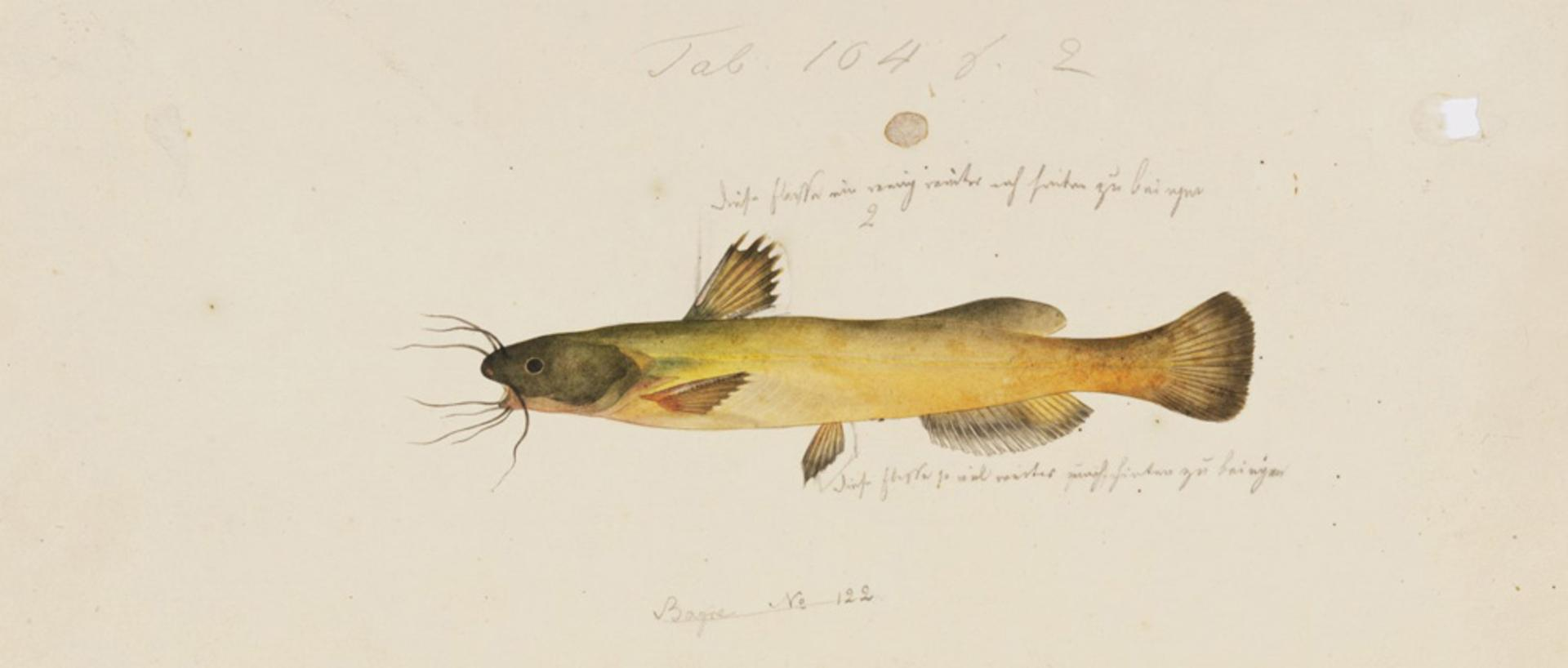
Tachysurus aurantiacus (Temminck and Schlegel) by Kawahara Keiga, 1823 - 1829

Incertae sedis

- Tachysurus changi (Miao, 1934)
- Tachysurus eupogoides (Wu, 1930)
- Tachysurus hirsutus (Herre, 1934)
- Tachysurus rendahli (Pellegrin & Fang, 1940)
- Tachysurus tonkinensis (V. H. Nguyễn, 2006)
- Tachysurus wangi (Miao, 1934)
- Tachysurus yeni (V. H. Nguyễn & H. D. Nguyễn, 2006)
- Tachysurus zhangfei Shao, Cheng & Zhang, 2021 (published online, without ZooBank registration)
