= Wei River =

Major river in China

Coordinates: 34°36′42″N 110°17′20″E

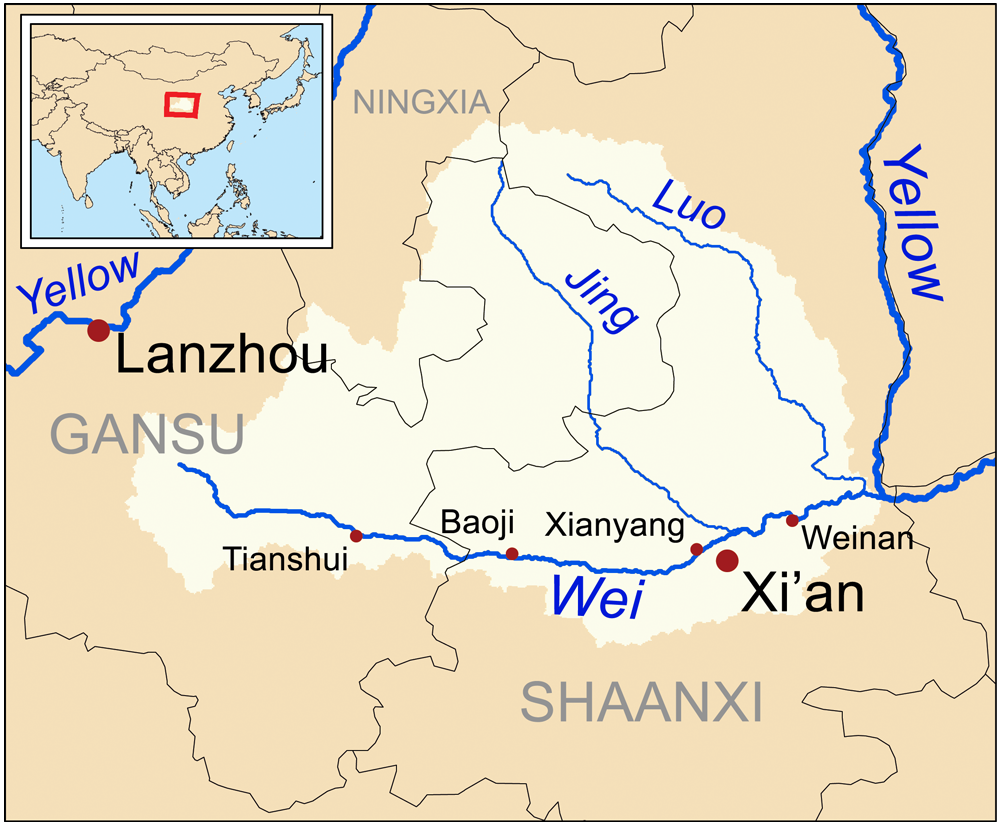
The drainage basin of the modern Wei.

The Wei River, the largest tributary of the Yellow River, flows into the main stream on its right bank in the middle reaches.

The Wei River (Chinese: 渭河; pinyin: Wèi Hé; Wade–Giles: Wei Ho) is a major river in west-central China's Gansu and Shaanxi provinces. It is the largest tributary of the Yellow River and very important in the early development of Chinese civilization. In ancient times, such as in the Records of the Grand Historian, the river was called Wei Shui (渭水; Wèishuǐ; 'Wei water').

The total length of the Wei River is 818 km (508 mi), covering a drainage area of 135,000 km^{2} (52,000 sq mi). Some of the major tributaries include the Luo River, Jing River, Niutou River, Feng River and the Chishui River. In a direct line, it travels due east for 700 km (430 mi) before draining into the Yellow River at Tongguan County near the tri-provincial boundary between Shaanxi, Shanxi and Henan provinces, with a series of major cities along its course including Tianshui, Baoji, Xianyang, Xi'an and Weinan.

== Course ==
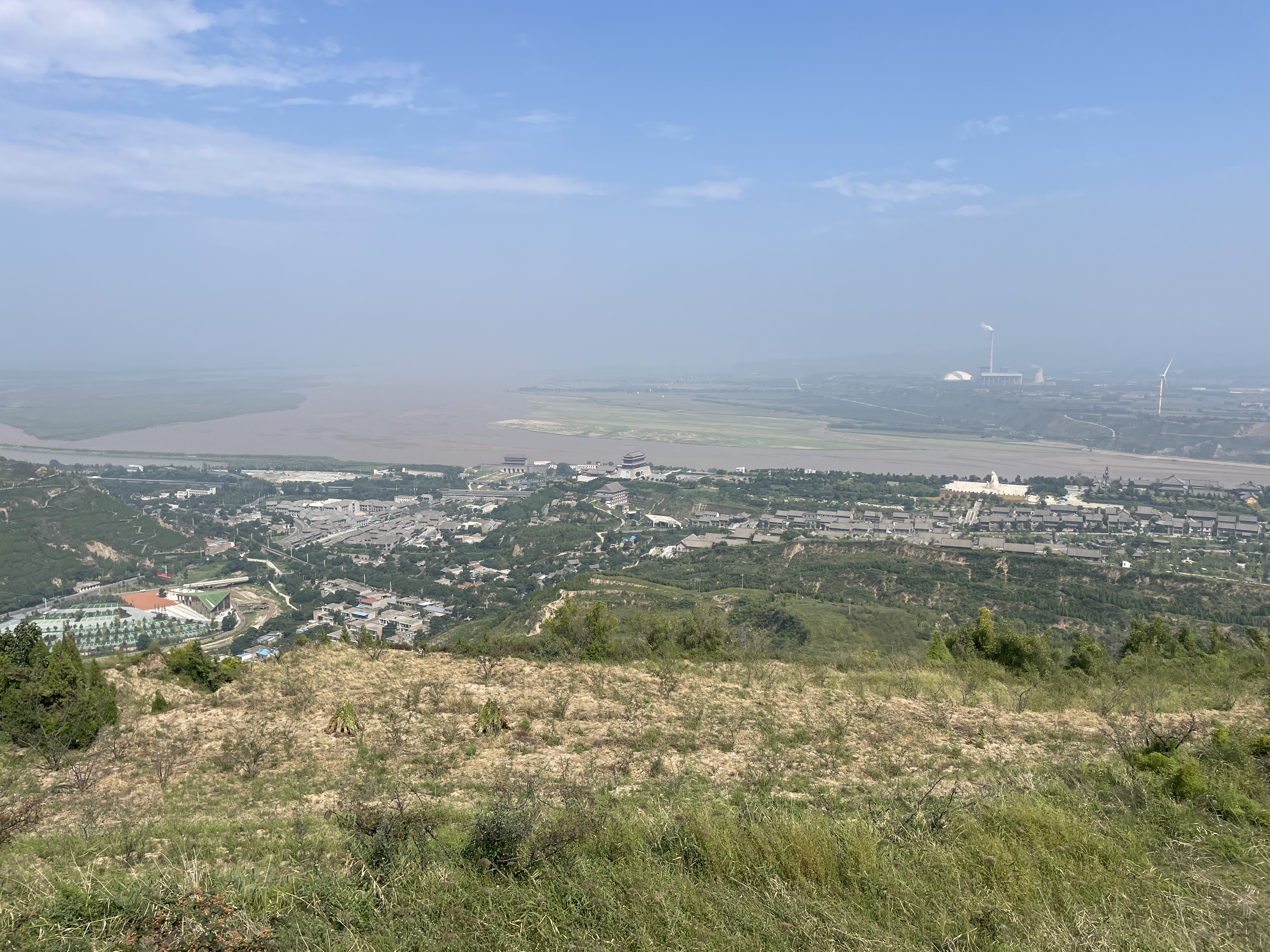
Confluence of Wei River and Yellow River in Tongguan County

The source of the Wei River starts in the mountainous region in southern Weiyuan County (literally meaning "Wei's source"), Gansu province, with the westernmost headwater of its mainstem Qingyuan River (清源河) less than 1.6 km (0.99 mi) away from a headwater of Manba River, a main tributary of the Tao River, which is the second-largest tributary of the Yellow River (behind the Wei River itself). The head of the Wei River proper — formed by confluence of the Qingyuan River with two small tributaries to its northwest — is less than 110 km (68 mi) from the Yellow River at Lanzhou, but due to the sharp north turn the Yellow River takes in Lanzhou to form the Ordos Loop, the Wei and the Yellow River do not meet for more than 2,000 km (1,200 mi) further along the Yellow River's course.

After being joined by numerous other tributaries just east of the Weiyuan County town center, the Wei River turns slightly southeast until it reaches Wushan County, continuing east for 20 km (12 mi) before turning slightly southeast again at Gangu County and curves north of Tianshui, the second-largest city of Gansu. After picking up the Ji River (耤河, the urban river of Tianshui) east of the city, the Wei River enters the Mount Long and emerges to become the principal river in the Guanzhong Basin. It drains into the Yellow River south of the boundary between Dali County and Tongguan County, just as the Yellow River bends sharply east to enter the North China Plain.

== Climate ==
The Wei River valley has a continental climate, with hot summers and cool, dry winters. It sits between the arid steppes and deserts to the north and the forests of the Qingling mountains. Its natural vegetation would be a steppe-forest, but it has been transformed by human activity and is mostly agricultural.

== History ==
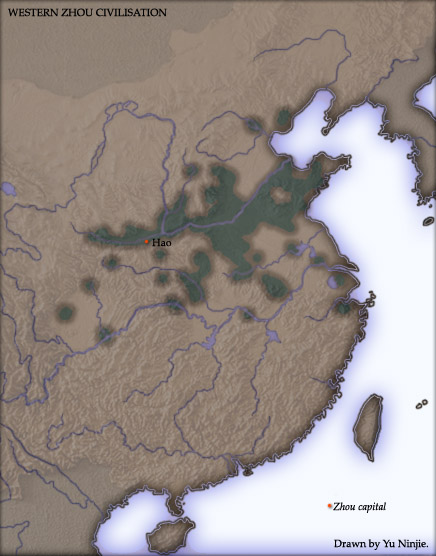
Population concentration during the Western Zhou dynasty (1050–771 BC). Note the extension up the Wei valley.

In Chinese mythology, the giant Kua Fu drained the Yellow River and the Wei River to quench his burning thirst as he pursued the Sun. The valley of the Wei was one of the early cradles of Chinese civilization, along which the capitals of the Zhou, Qin, Han, and Tang dynasties were situated. The area of Dingxi around its headwaters in Gansu has numerous Stone Age sites from various early cultures. The Wei Valley is likely the earliest center of Chinese civilization, and also the location of China's first major irrigation works. Some Chinese historians now believe the Wei is the ancient Jiang River that gave its name to the families of Shennong and the Yan emperor, two Chinese legendary heroes credited with the early development of agriculture there.

As "China's natural gateway" to the west, the headwaters of the Wei River are also notable in the development of the Northern Silk Road. The Chinese segment of the Northern Silk Road connected Chang'an (then the capital of China) to the west via Baoji, Tianshui at the Wei's headwaters, Lanzhou, Dunhuang, and the Wushao Ling Mountain, before looping north of the Taklamakan on its way to Kashgar and the routes into Parthia.

The 1556 Shaanxi earthquake had its epicenter in the Wei valley.

The Wei River Bridge (Weihe Qiao 渭河桥) featured in the design of the 5000-yuan note of the first series of the renminbi, dated 1953, and shows a train passing over the bridge.

Construction of the Sanmenxia Dam in 1960 caused extensive sedimentation problems in the lower reaches of the Wei river. The construction of the Baojixia diversion works in 1972 and the creation of the Baojixia Irrigation District, with 128,000 hectares (490 sq mi) of cropland under irrigation have resulted in reduced flows.

In September 2003 extensive rainfall led to flooding that caused over 30 fatalities, and temporarily displaced over 300,000 people. Ecological aspects of the Wei River have been examined with respect to flow rates in the Wei River.

== See also ==
- Guanzhong
