= Gozu (disambiguation) =

Gozu is a 2003 Japanese horror film by Takashi Miike

Gozu may also refer to:

== Religion and mythology ==
- Gozu Tennō, a Japanese deity
- Gozu ("Cow Head"), a Japanese urban legend
- Ox-Head, a character in Chinese mythology, known in Japan as Gozu

== Other ==
- Masao Gozu (born 1946), Japanese photographer and sculptor
- Great Gozu, a character in the television series Danganronpa 3: The End of Hope's Peak High School
- Coba Höyük, an archaeological site in Turkey, also known as Sakçe Gözü
- Mount Gozu, a mountain at Agano, Niigata

== See also ==
- Cow head
