= Tachysurus mica =

Scientific classification
- Kingdom: Animalia
- Phylum: Chordata
- Class: Actinopterygii
- Division: Teleostei
- Order: Siluriformes
- Family: Bagridae
- Genus: Tachysurus
- Species: T. mica

Binomial name
- Tachysurus mica (Gromov, 1970)

Synonyms
- Mystus mica Gromov, 1970

Species of ray-finned fish

Tachysurus mica is a fish of the family Bagridae that is widely distributed in Eastern Asia, spanning from the Russian Far East southward to Central China. It is a species of bagrid catfish and a member of the T. argentivittatus species complex.

== Appearance ==
Tachysurus mica reaches a maximum length of 6 cm.

The body is short and relatively high. A dark stripe runs along the upper part of the head from the snout and along the entire back to the caudal fin. A similar stripe also extends along the lateral line, passing onto both lobes of the caudal fin. A wide transverse band is located in front of the dorsal fin. Around the mouth, there are four pairs of barbels, of which the maxillary barbels usually reach the base of the pectoral fin. The pectoral spine is well developed, smooth on the outer side, with strong, slightly curved spines on its inner side.

Unlike T. argentivittatus, this form features a wide transverse band located specifically in front of the dorsal fin. It also possesses a distinct dark stripe running along the lateral line onto both lobes of the caudal fin, alongside the dorsal stripe.

== Distribution ==
T. mica inhabits the Amur and Yangtze River basins, including lakes Khummi, Bolon, and Khanka.

== Habitat ==
Tachysurus mica thrives in a variety of habitats, including lakes, oxbows, and slow-moving streams. It prefers sandy or silty substrates.

== Life cycle and reproduction ==
Spawning occurs from June to July. Females lay around 700 eggs. The eggs are greenish in color and measure approximately 1 mm.

== Diet ==
Tachysurus mica feeds on insect larvae, small crustaceans, and detritus.
