= Private ski area (North America) =

Membership-based ski resort

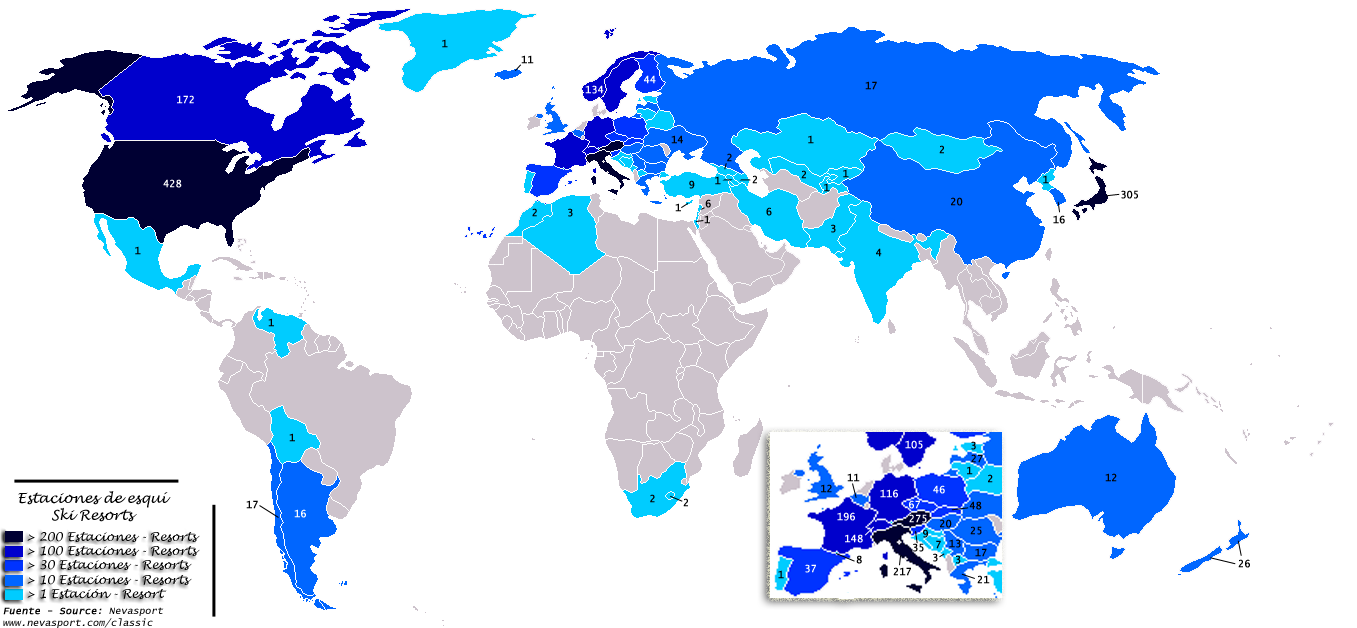
Ski resorts in the World by country

A private ski area is a membership based type of ski resort developed primarily for skiing, snowboarding, and other winter sports. Like a country club, private ski areas in North America offer exclusive memberships, usually based on an initiation fee and annual dues. In this context, it is the presence of exclusive memberships rather than private ownership that makes a ski area private.

Private ski areas offer a range of public access. Many smaller or more rural areas allow day tickets (sometimes with a daily cap) and/or trial memberships to be sold. Highly exclusive areas, namely Montana's 13,450 acre Yellowstone Club near Big Sky Resort, do not sell day tickets and require "that prospective members show evidence of a net worth of at least $3 million and pay a membership deposit of $250,000." in addition to the $16,000 annual fee and the mandatory purchase of property at the resort. The Hermitage Club in Vermont has two days a year when residents of the nearby towns of Wilmington and Dover can ski for free.

Furthermore, some of North America's more luxury public ski areas such as Colorado's Aspen, Telluride, and Vail now offer private clubs to supplement the publicly accessed skiing. Generally, large commercial ski areas in North America are not able to privatize access to trails or pistes due to the mandates of the federal bodies that own and seasonally lease public land to the commercial groups. Thus the private clubs and lodges at such destination resorts are limited to privately owned land, and membership may simply include a lifetime or family pass to the public skiing facilities.

== Exclusivity of private ski areas ==
All ski areas can be seen as exclusive spaces due to the financial requirements of downhill equipment and day ticket or season ticket prices. Due to the most common construct of ski areas as for profit commercial enterprises, ski areas are already semi-private because they limit access through wealth, and by association social class. Exceptions to this include city or community owned ski areas such as Juneau, Alaska's Eaglecrest Ski Area and Sudbury, Ontario's Adanac Ski Hill, that focus on promoting recreation by subsidizing ticket prices, making used gear readily available, and youth outreach.

Because of the Right to Freedom of Association, found internationally and in the United States Bill of Rights, private social organizations that do not perform a significant public function are not forced to accept members. Therefore, social organizations including country clubs and private ski areas are allowed to have 'invitation only' membership.

Not all membership based ski areas operate with the high costs that the Yellowstone Club has become known for since opening its doors in 2000. Vermont's Hermitage Club features an 80,000 square foot clubhouse with a lap pool, spa, bowling alley and teen center but has a more modest $75,000 initiation fee. HoliMont ski area in Ellicottville, NY began as a 13 family club in 1962 and is now the largest private ski area by members. HoliMont charges $3,600 per year per family and sells day tickets to visitors on non-holiday weekdays. In comparison, an individual season pass to Whistler Blackcomb, a public resort and an official 2010 Winter Olympics host venue, costs the average adult $1,795 Canadian. Massachusetts' Mount Greylock Ski Club is another private ski club that stands in contrast to the high levels of exclusion and opulent facilities of the Yellowstone Club. As one of the oldest ski areas in the United States, Greylock exists on the slopes of one of Massachusetts highest peaks but only operates two small surface lifts, one powered by a salvaged Ford motor. In 1950, when membership cost $3, Greylock had a 2,000 person membership and a waiting list. Today Greylock has ample space with only 150 current members at a family rate of $150.

== Canada ==
Ontario

Due to the small size of Ontario's ski areas, many 'public' ski areas are at least partially on private land, and many private ski areas offer passes to non-members. This blurs the distinction between a public, and an exclusive or private ski club. The list following includes notable clubs advertising their private status.

- Alpine Ski Club of Toronto
- Beaver Valley Ski Club
- Caledon Ski Club
- Craigleith Ski Club
- Georgian Peaks Club
- Mansfield Ski Club

== United States ==
=== California ===
- Buckhorn Ski and Snowboard Club –Three Points

=== Massachusetts ===
- Mount Greylock Ski Club – Williamstown

=== Michigan ===
- The Homestead –?Glen Arbor
- The Otsego Club & Resort – Gaylord

=== Montana ===
- Yellowstone Club – Big Sky

=== New York ===
- Cazenovia Ski Club – Cazenovia
- HoliMont – Ellicottville
- Hunt Hollow – Naples
- Windham Mountain Club – Windham

=== Utah ===
- Wasatch Peaks Ranch Ski Resort – Peterson
- Powder Haven – Eden

=== Vermont ===
- Bear Creek Mountain Club – Plymouth
- Chapman Hill Ski Area – Williston
- The Hermitage Club At Haystack Mountain – Wilmington
- Quechee Lakes Ski Area – Quechee

=== Washington ===
- Meany Lodge – Snoqualmie Pass
- Sahalie Ski Club – Snoqualmie Pass

=== Wisconsin ===
- Ausblick Ski Club – Sussex
- Blackhawk Ski Club – Middleton
- Fox Hill Ski Area – West Bend
- Heiliger Huegel Ski Club – Hubertus

== See also ==
- Comparison of North American ski resorts
- List of ski areas and resorts
- List of ski areas and resorts in Canada
- List of ski areas and resorts in the United States
- Membership discrimination in California social clubs
