= Niutou River =

River in China

Coordinates: 34.6131°N 105.9556°E

The Niutou River (Chinese: 牛头河; pinyin: Niútóu Hé) is a major tributary of the Wei River, streaming north-east of Tianshui and through the town of Qingshui. The river has a total length of 84.6 kilometres (52.6 miles).
