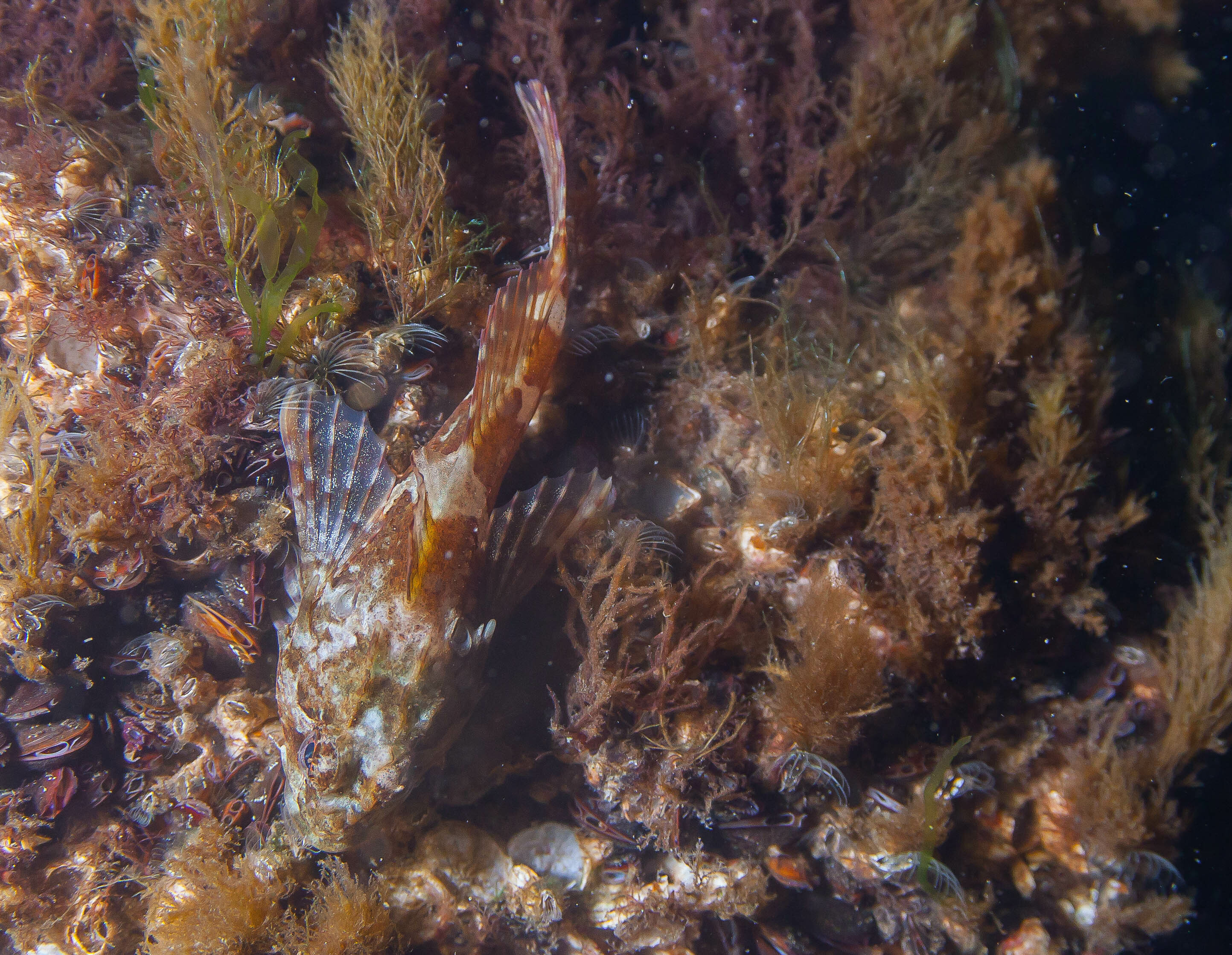
- Norway bullhead Bornholm

Conservation status
- Least Concern (IUCN 3.1)

Scientific classification
- Kingdom: Animalia
- Phylum: Chordata
- Class: Actinopterygii
- Order: Perciformes
- Suborder: Cottoidei
- Superfamily: Cottoidea
- Family: Psychrolutidae
- Genus: Micrenophrys; Andriashev, 1954
- Species: M. lilljeborgii

Binomial name
- Micrenophrys lilljeborgii (Collett, 1875)

Synonyms
- Cottus lilljeborgii Collett, 1875

= Norway bullhead =

Species of fish

The Norway bullhead (Micrenophrys lilljeborgii) is a species of marine ray-finned fish belonging to the family Cottidae, the typical sculpins. This species is found in the northeastern Atlantic Ocean.

== Taxonomy ==
The Norway bullhead was first formally described as Cottus lilljeborgii in 1875 by the Norwegian zoologist Robert Collett with its type locality given as Hardangerfjord. In 1954 the Soviet ichthyologist Anatoly Andriyashev classified this species in the monospecific subgenus Micrenophrys of the genus Taurulus, Micrenophrys is now recognised as a valid genus. The 5th edition of Fishes of the World classifies this genus in the subfamily Cottinae of the family Cottidae but other authorities classify it in the subfamily Psychrolutinae of the family Psychrolutidae.

== Etymology ==
The Norway bullhead's generic name, Micrenophrys prefixes miccro, meaning "small" to Enophrys, a related Cottid genus. Collett did not name the person honoured in the specific name but it is most likely to be the Swedish zoologist Wilhelm Lilljeborg, who Collett referred to extensively.

== Description ==
The Norway bullhead is a small fish with a maximum published standard length of 7.4 cm (2.9 in). There is a complete, rather irregular line of sharp prickles along the base of both dorsal fins. there are no small bony grain-like bumps on the head and any bumps behind the eyes are either very small or absent. The protuberances on the occipital are paired and low. The upper spine on the preoperculum is long and ribust but does not reach the flap of the operculum. There is a small barbel at on the upper jaw at the corner of the mouth. The dorsal fins are supported by 8 or 9 spines and 11 or 12 soft rays while the anal fin has between 6 and 9 soft rays. The overall colour is reddish-olive, marked with 4 dark saddle-like bands on back and upper sides. The head is yellowish in colour with a single dark band. The spiny dorsal fin has a clear black spot. When breeding the males develop a red band on head across the and red blotches on the sides.

== Distribution and habitat ==
The Norway bullhead is found in the northeastern Atlantic Ocean where it is found around Iceland, the Faroe Islands, Scotland, the west and north coasts of Ireland and the southwestern coasts of Scandinavia. It has been reported from the southern North Sea and as far south as Brittany but these records have not been formally published. This is a benthic species of gravel or shell substrates and algal beds at depths from 0 to 100 m (0 to 328 ft) which is able to tolerate temperatures lower than 0 °C (32 °F).

== Biology ==
The Norway bullhead feeds on small crustaceans, such as amphipods and copepods, and small fishes. They spawn in the early Spring laying clumps of demersal eggs on the sea bed which hatch into pelagic larvae.
