= Bucephala =

Bucephala may refer to:

- Bucephala (bird), the goldeneye, a duck genus
- Bucephala is the name of at least two cities:
  - Bucephala, or Alexandria Bucephalus, a city in Punjab founded by Alexander the Great and named in honor of his horse, Bucephalus
  - Bucephala Acra, a city located on a promontory near Troezen in the Argolid

== See also ==
- Bucephalus (disambiguation)
- Cow head (disambiguation)
- Bullhead (disambiguation)
