= Wilmington (CDP), Vermont =

Census-designated place in Vermont, United States

Wilmington, Vermont
- Census-designated place
- Location within Vermont Location within the United States
- Coordinates: 42°52′26″N 72°52′18″W
- Country: United States
- State: Vermont
- County: Windham
- Town: Wilmington

Area
  - Total: 1.10 sq mi (2.84 km^{2})
  - Land: 1.08 sq mi (2.81 km^{2})
  - Water: 0.015 sq mi (0.04 km^{2})
- Elevation: 1,539 ft (469 m)

Population (2020)
  - Total: 439
- Time zone: UTC-5 (Eastern (EST))
  - Summer (DST): UTC-4 (EDT)
- ZIP Code: 05363
- Area code: 802
- FIPS code: 50-84625
- GNIS feature ID: 2586661

Wilmington is the primary village and a census-designated place (CDP) in the town of Wilmington, Windham County, Vermont, United States. As of the 2020 census, it had a population of 439, compared to 2,255 in the entire town. The center of the village is part of the Wilmington Village Historic District.

== Geography ==
The CDP is in southwestern Windham County, at the geographic center of the town of Wilmington, on the east side of the Green Mountains. It sits in the valley of the North Branch of the Deerfield River, which flows west to join the main stem of the Deerfield at the north end of Harriman Reservoir in western Wilmington. The area is part of the Connecticut River watershed.

Vermont Route 9 (East and West Main Street) passes through the village, leading east 19 miles (31 km) to Brattleboro and west 20 miles (32 km) to Bennington. Vermont Route 100 (North Main Street) leads north from the center of Wilmington 8 miles (13 km) to Dover. Route 100 joins Route 9 going east out of Wilmington, then turns south and leads 5 miles (8 km) to Jacksonville.
