= Mikhail Gromov =

Mikhail Gromov or Mikhael Gromov (Russian: Михаи́л Гро́мов) may refer to:

- Mikhael Gromov (mathematician) (Mikhail "Misha" Leonidovich Gromov, born 1943)
- Mikhail Gromov (aviator) (Mikhail Mikhailovich Gromov, 1899–1985)
- Mikhail Gromov, Russian politician who contested the 2024 Moscow City Duma election
