= Dianchi bullhead =

Conservation status
- Critically Endangered (IUCN 3.1)

Scientific classification
- Kingdom: Animalia
- Phylum: Chordata
- Class: Actinopterygii
- Division: Teleostei
- Order: Siluriformes
- Family: Bagridae
- Genus: Tachysurus
- Species: T. medianalis

Binomial name
- Tachysurus medianalis (Regan, 1904)

Synonyms
- Macrones medianalis Regan, 1904; Leiocassis medianalis (Regan, 1904); Pseudobagrus medianalis (Regan, 1904)

Species of fish

The Dianchi bullhead, Tachysurus medianalis, is a species of catfish in the family Bagridae. It is endemic to the Lake Dianchi basin in Yunnan, China. It can grow to 20 cm (7.9 in) TL. It is a cryptic, benthic fish that hides during the daytime and forages on small fishes and aquatic invertebrates at night.

== Habitat and conservation ==
This species was once a common fish in Lake Dianchi, but is now mainly restricted to spring systems draining to the lake. This habitat is under threat from pollution and from conversion into fish ponds. An ex-situ conservation effort has been planned.
