= Wilmington, Vermont =

Town in Windham County, Vermont, US

- Town
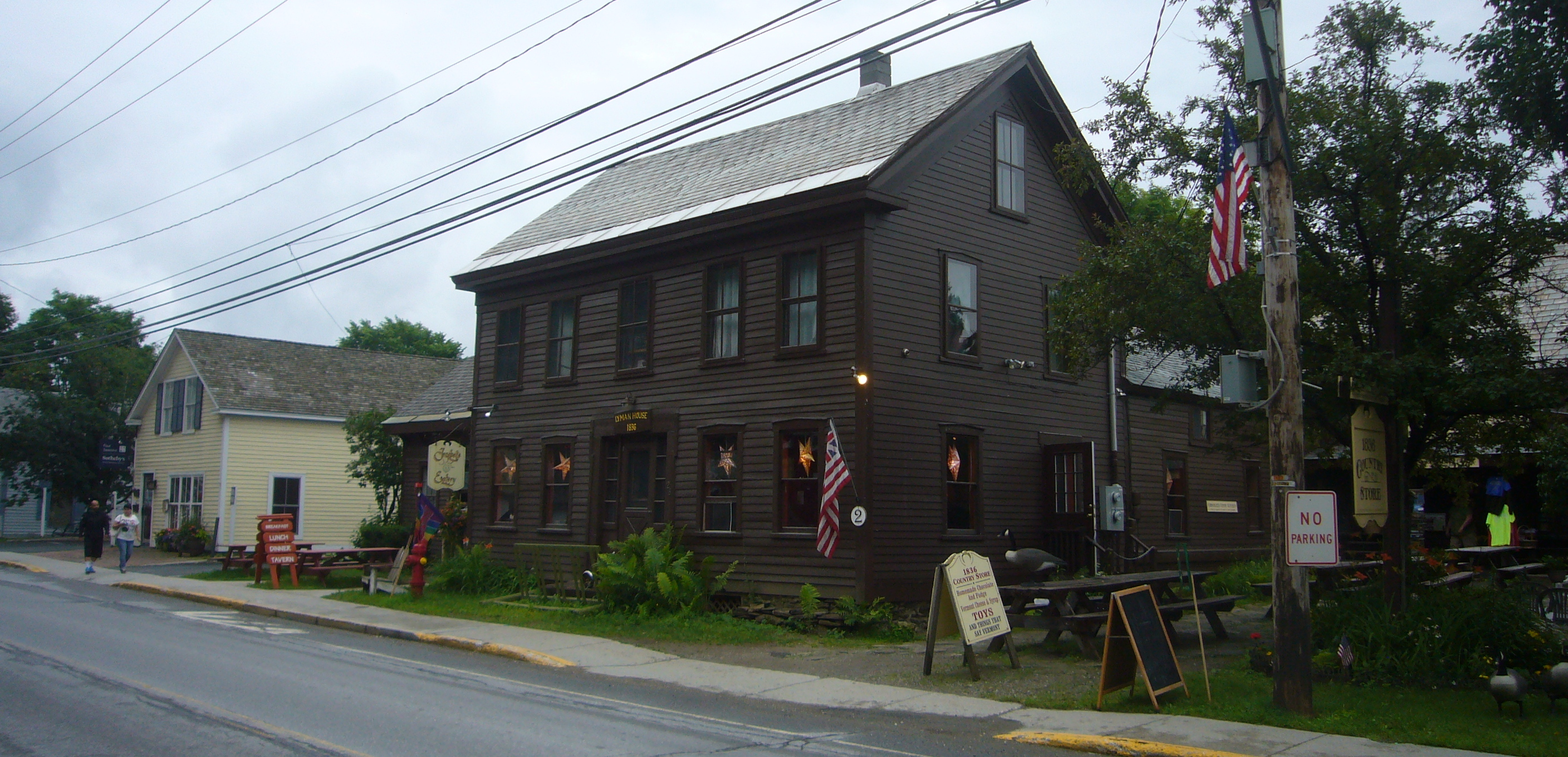
- Historic Lyman House

- Seal Logo

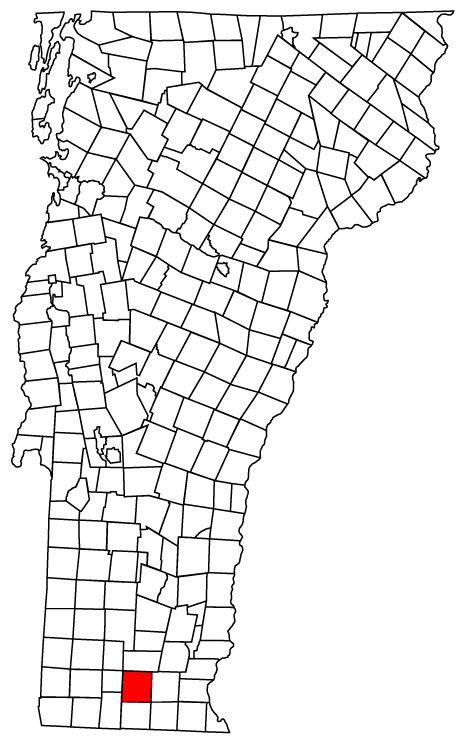
- Wilmington, Vermont
- Coordinates: 42°52′59″N 72°52′02″W
- Country: United States
- State: Vermont
- County: Windham
- Incorporated: 1751
- Communities: Wilmington; Chimney Hill; Medburyville

Area
  - Total: 41.3 sq mi (106.9 km^{2})
  - Land: 39.5 sq mi (102.2 km^{2})
  - Water: 1.8 sq mi (4.7 km^{2})
- Elevation: 1,516 ft (462 m)

Population (2020)
  - Total: 2,255
  - Density: 57/sq mi (22.1/km^{2})
- Time zone: UTC-5 (Eastern (EST))
  - Summer (DST): UTC-4 (EDT)
- ZIP Codes: 05363
- Area code: 802
- FIPS code: 50-84700
- GNIS feature ID: 1462264
- Website: wilmingtonvermont.us

Wilmington is a town in Windham County, Vermont, United States. The population was 2,255 at the 2020 census. The town was chartered in 1751 by Benning Wentworth, colonial governor of New Hampshire. It was named in honor of Spencer Compton, 1st Earl of Wilmington.

== History ==
The town was chartered in 1751 by Benning Wentworth, colonial governor of New Hampshire. It was named in honor of Spencer Compton, 1st Earl of Wilmington. Wilmington is the home of Haystack Mountain Ski Area, which operates as the private Hermitage Club.

Part of the village of Wilmington comprises the Wilmington Village Historic District, listed on the National Register of Historic Places.

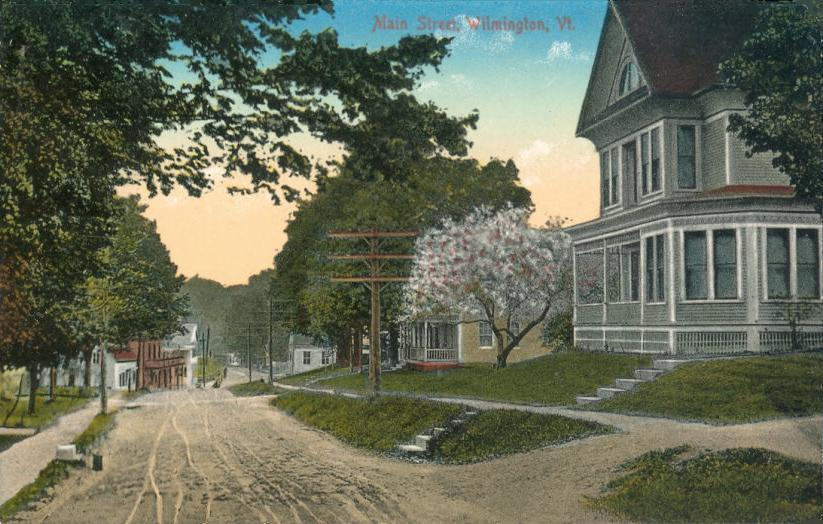
Main Street Wilmington, 1914

== Geography ==
According to the United States Census Bureau, the town has a total area of 41.3 square miles (106.9 km^{2}), of which 39.4 square miles (102.1 km^{2}) is land and 1.8 square miles (4.7 km^{2}) (4.39%) is water. Wilmington is drained by the North Branch Deerfield River, as well as Meadow Brook, Rose Brook, Haystack Brook, Hall Brook, Ellis Brook, Beaver Brook, Negus Brook and Wilder Brook. It is located in the Deerfield Valley of the Green Mountains.

There are two census-designated places in the town. The village of Wilmington is in the center of the town, and Chimney Hill is in the west.

The town of Wilmington is home to Lake Raponda, a 116-acre lake with a maximum depth of 12 feet, home to fish species such as bullhead, chain pickerel, panfish, rainbow trout, smallmouth bass, and yellow perch. The Town Health Officer had temporarily closed the lake in July 2018 due to high levels of E. coli. In the summer of 2022, the Vermont Fish and Wildlife Department introduced the Eagle Lake trout subspecies of rainbow trout into the lake, as well as 10 other lakes around the state. In 2023, the Vermont Department of Environmental Conservation awarded the lake the "Gold Lake Wise Award".

== Transportation ==
The town is crossed by:

- Vermont Route 9
- Vermont Route 100

The Deerfield Valley Transit Association (DVTA) is the primary public local bus transportation provider for Wilmington and the rest of the Deerfield Valley. Their nickname, "the MOOver", derives from their buses' black and white Holstein cow paint scheme and appearance. In addition, weekday express bus service to Bennington is provided by both the DVTA (mornings) and the Green Mountain Express' Emerald Line (evenings).

The closest Greyhound bus stop and Amtrak train station to Wilmington is in Brattleboro.

== Demographics ==
Historical population
Census	Pop.	Note	%±
1790	645		—
1800	1,011		56.7%
1810	1,193		18.0%
1820	1,369		14.8%
1830	1,367		−0.1%
1840	1,296		−5.2%
1850	1,372		5.9%
1860	1,424		3.8%
1870	1,246		−12.5%
1880	1,130		−9.3%
1890	1,106		−2.1%
1900	1,221		10.4%
1910	1,229		0.7%
1920	1,483		20.7%
1930	1,171		−21.0%
1940	1,221		4.3%
1950	1,169		−4.3%
1960	1,245		6.5%
1970	1,586		27.4%
1980	1,808		14.0%
1990	1,968		8.8%
2000	2,225		13.1%
2010	1,876		−15.7%
2020	2,255		20.2%
U.S. Decennial Census

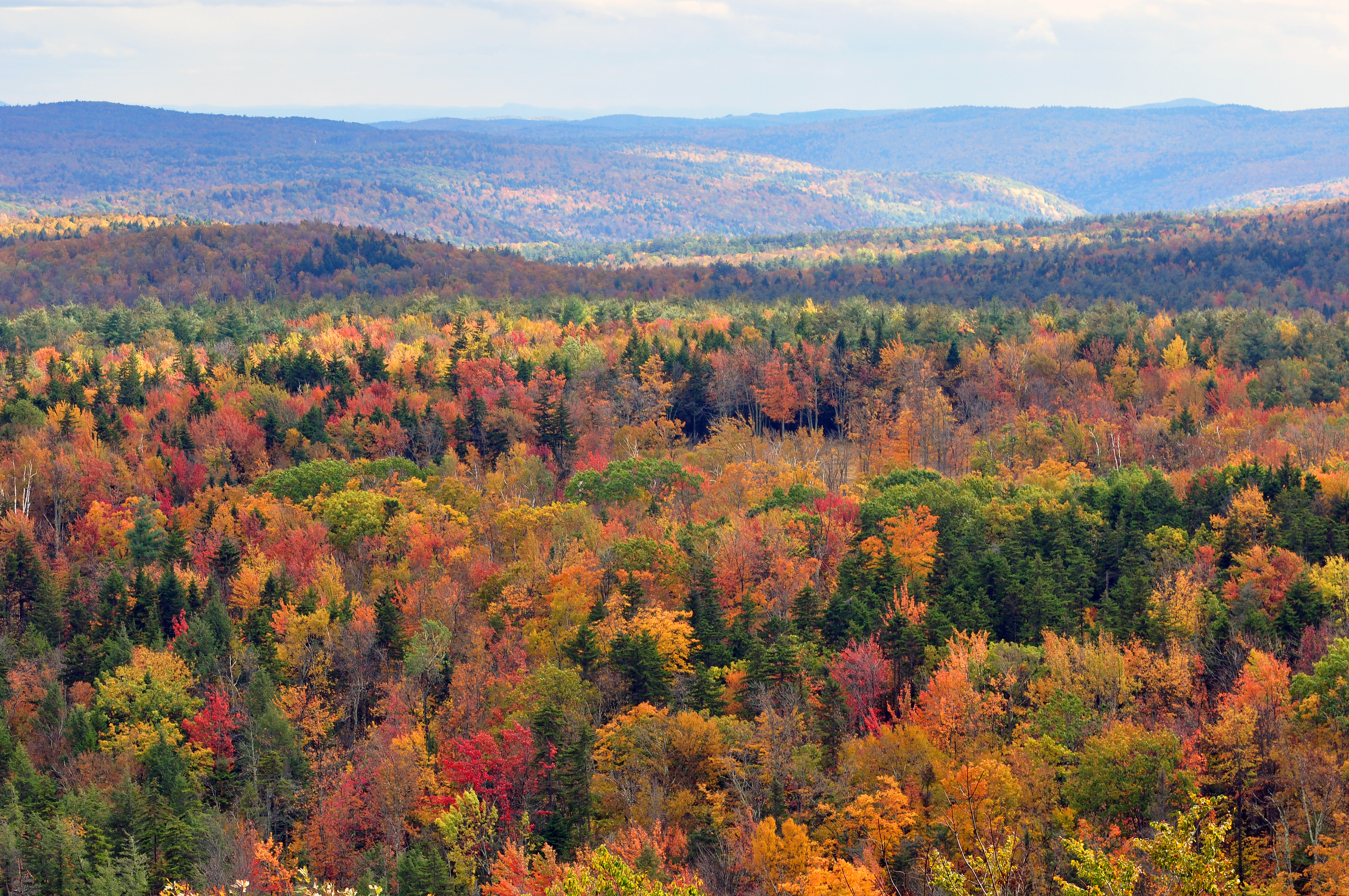
October 2009 fall foliage seen from Hogback Mountain

As of the census of 2000, there were 2,225 people, 992 households, and 597 families residing in the town. The population density was 56.4 people per square mile (21.8/km^{2}). There were 2,232 housing units at an average density of 56.6 per square mile (21.9/km^{2}). The racial makeup of the town was 97.80% White, 0.22% African American, 0.27% Native American, 0.58% Asian, 0.18% from other races, and 0.94% from two or more races. Hispanic or Latino of any race were 0.94% of the population.

There were 992 households, out of which 26.0% had children under the age of 18 living with them, 48.6% were married couples living together, 7.8% had a female householder with no husband present, and 39.8% were non-families. 32.5% of all households were made up of individuals, and 8.0% had someone living alone who was 65 years of age or older. The average household size was 2.24 and the average family size was 2.84.

In the town, the population was spread out, with 21.6% under the age of 18, 7.0% from 18 to 24, 26.7% from 25 to 44, 30.6% from 45 to 64, and 14.1% who were 65 years of age or older. The median age was 42 years. For every 100 females, there were 101.0 males. For every 100 females age 18 and over, there were 98.7 males.

The median income for a household in the town was $37,396, and the median income for a family was $46,786. Males had a median income of $29,511 versus $23,417 for females. The per capita income for the town was $25,171. About 7.0% of families and 9.3% of the population were below the poverty line, including 15.2% of those under age 18 and 5.6% of those age 65 or over.

== Education ==
A consolidation took place between Whitingham High School (WHS) and Wilmington Middle High School (WMHS) and the local school is now called Twin Valley High School (TVHS). Towards the end of 2005, a proposal was made to construct a new high school, but voters rejected the needed bond issue.

== Climate ==
Wilmington experiences a humid continental climate (Koppen Dfb) with warm, humid summers and cold (sometimes severely cold) winters. While snowfall can vary greatly from year to year in nearby towns like Bennington and Brattleboro, Wilmington's snowfall is consistently heavy each year because of its elevation in the Green Mountains' high country.

=== Tropical Storm Irene ===
August 28, 2011 – The town of Wilmington, and the state of Vermont, was hit by Tropical Storm Irene. Thirteen inches of rainfall came through over course of 10 hours, comparable to dumping 26 swimming pools on every acre of land. The rivers flooded over their banks washing away buildings, destroying downtown businesses and inventory, and displacing families from their homes. In terms of infrastructure, Wilmington was the hardest hit town in the entire state. Almost immediately after the storm subsided, residents began the work of cleaning up. Within days the National Guard was repairing washed out roads, businesses were getting cleaned out, and fund raising began to help affected people and businesses to get back on their feet. The Wilmington Flood Relief Fund, chaired by Adam Palmiter, raised just shy of $500,000 to benefit local businesses and flood relief throughout the Deerfield Valley. By the date of the one year anniversary, the town was again thriving with many businesses back better than ever, tourists excited to shop locally, and new opportunities on the horizon.

=== Vermont snowfall record ===
Snowfall amount exceeding yardstick in Vermont record snowstorm. 54 in (1.4 m) in a single blizzard. Wilmington, Vt. 2010.

Wilmington is in the heart of the Southern Vermont snowbelt. This snowbelt lies mainly within the southern Vermont portion of the Green Mountain National Forest and includes the high elevation Southern Vermont towns of Woodford, Searsburg, Wilmington and Marlboro. Between February 24 and 27, 2010, Wilmington received a record 54 in (1.4 m) of snow. Over 4 ft (1.2 m) of snow fell during this February 2010 blizzard. Snowfall amounts of 54 in (1.4 m) up to 67 in (1.7 m) were reported for Wilmington, West Dover and the surrounding towns. The February 2010 blizzard in Wilmington and West Dover appears to be the single storm snowfall record for anywhere in the state of Vermont in Vermont weather record keeping history. The previous single storm snowfall record was 50 in (1.3 m) between March 2–5, 1947 in Readsboro, Vermont.

== Notable people ==
- Charles N. Davenport, attorney and Democratic Party leader
- G. William Hamilton, legislator
- James William Locke, lawyer and judge
- Elswyth Thane, romance novelist
- James Manning Tyler, judge and United States congressman
- Halsey William Wilson, publisher
