= Tachysurus sinensis =

Conservation status
- Least Concern (IUCN 3.1)

Scientific classification
- Kingdom: Animalia
- Phylum: Chordata
- Class: Actinopterygii
- Division: Teleostei
- Order: Siluriformes
- Family: Bagridae
- Genus: Tachysurus
- Species: T. sinensis

Binomial name
- Tachysurus sinensis Lacépède, 1803

Synonyms
- Arius sinensis (Lacepède, 1803); Silurus calvarius Basilewsky, 1855; Pseudobagrus wittenburgi Popta, 1911

Species of fish

Tachysurus sinensis, the Korean bullhead, is a species of bagrid catfish found in Europe and Asia: Amur River drainage, from Sakhalin (Russia), and rivers of western Korean Peninsula and China southward to the Yellow River. It has also been introduced into Hong Kong. It reaches a maximum length of 36.1 cm (14.2 in).
