= Kirill Gromov =

Russian ice hockey player

- Born: June 23, 1990 (age 34); Blagoveshchensk, Russian SFSR, Soviet Union
- Height: 6 ft 1 in (185 cm)
- Weight: 198 lb (90 kg; 14 st 2 lb)
- Position: Defence
- ALIH team Former teams: PSK Sakhalin; Amur Khabarovsk
- Playing career: 2008–present

Kirill Gromov (Russian: Кирилл Сергеевич Громов) is a Russian professional ice hockey defenceman who currently plays for PSK Sakhalin of the Asia League Ice Hockey (ALIH).

Gromov played eleven games for Amur Khabarovsk of the Kontinental Hockey League during the 2008–09 KHL season where he scored no points. He also played in the Kazakhstan Hockey Championship for Gornyak Rudny and Arlan Kokshetau and in the Professional Hockey League in Ukraine for HC Levy before joining Sakhalin in 2014.
