= Nikolai Gromov (footballer) =

Russian footballer

Personal information
- Full name: Nikolai Nikolayevich Gromov
- Date of birth: 1892
- Place of birth: St Petersburg, Russia
- Date of death: 1943 (aged 50–51)
- Position: Defender

Senior career*
Years	Team	Apps	(Gls)
1912	Triumf Saint Petersburg		
1913–1915	Sport Saint Petersburg		

International career
1913	Russia	1	(0)
- * Club domestic league appearances and goals

Nikolai Nikolayevich Gromov (Russian: Николай Николаевич Громов) (1892–1943) was an association football player.

== International career ==
Gromov played his only game for Russia on 14 September 1913 in a friendly against Norway.

He is said to have 'died at the front' while serving in the Second World War but other detail is lacking.
