= Alexander Gromov (politician) =

Russian politician

Alexander Georgiyevich Gromov
- Александр Георгиевич Громов

First deputy plenipotentiary presidential envoy to Central Federal District
- Incumbent
- Assumed office 12 February 2001
- President: Vladimir Putin, Dmitry Medvedev

KGB Officer
- In office 1973–1991
- President: Mikhail Yasnov, Vladimir Orlov, Vitaly Vorotnikov, Boris Yeltsin

Chairman of Russian Federal Service for Currency and Export Control
- In office January 2000 – May 2000
- President: Vladimir Putin

Alexander Georgiyevich Gromov (in Russian: Александр Георгиевич Громов, b. May 19, 1947, in Odintsovo, Moscow Oblast, Soviet Union) is a Russian politician.

Gromov served in the KGB during 1973–1991. As a KGB officer he took part in the Soviet–Afghan War. During January–May 2000 he was the chairman of the Russian Federal Service for Currency and Export Control. Since February 12, 2001, he has been a first deputy plenipotentiary presidential envoy to the Central Federal District.
