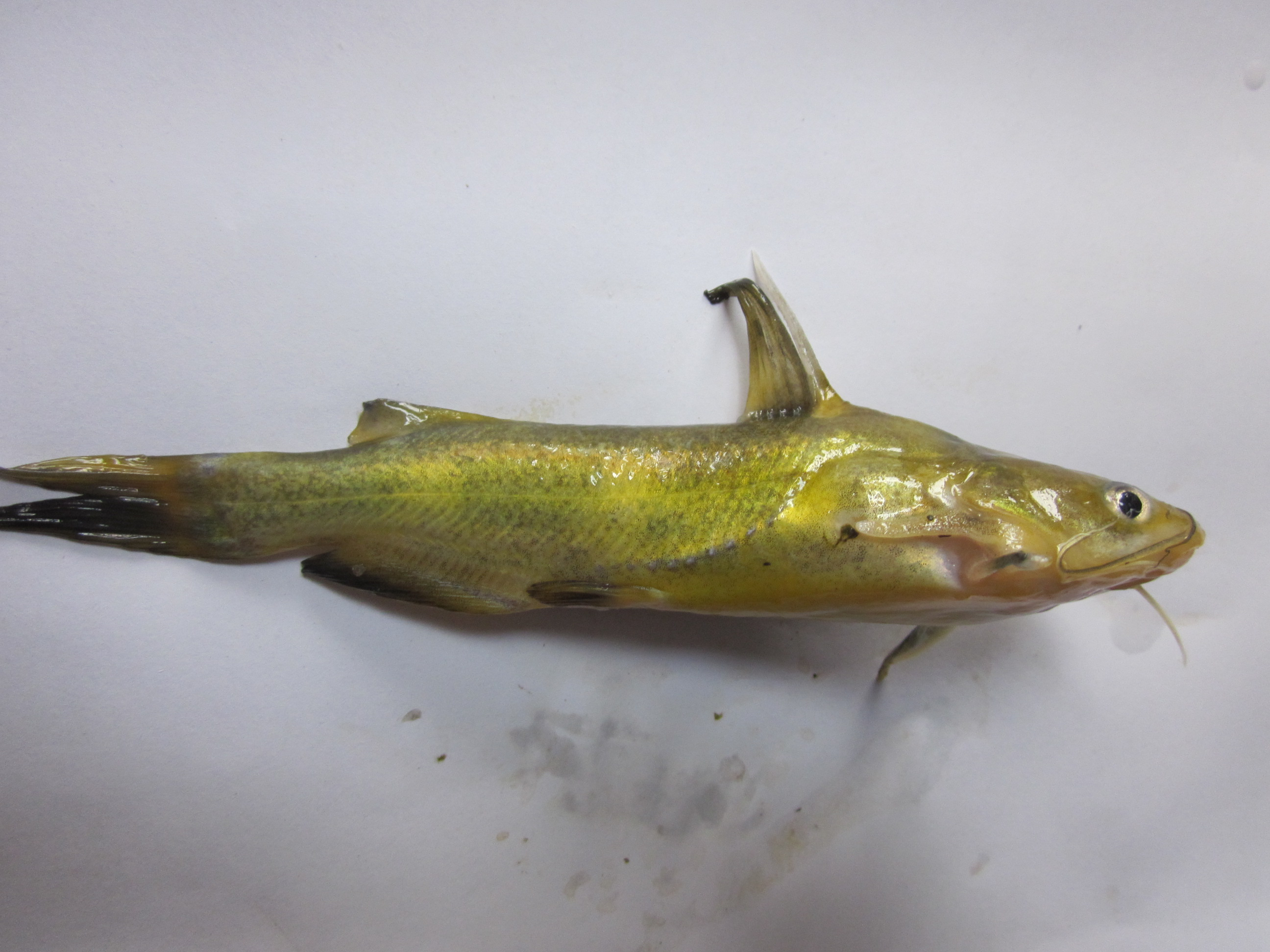

Conservation status
- Least Concern (IUCN 3.1)

Scientific classification
- Kingdom: Animalia
- Phylum: Chordata
- Class: Actinopterygii
- Division: Teleostei
- Order: Siluriformes
- Family: Bagridae
- Genus: Tachysurus
- Species: T. fulvidraco

Binomial name
- Tachysurus fulvidraco (Richardson, 1846)

Synonyms
- Pimelodus fulvidraco Richardson, 1846; Pelteobagrus fulvidraco (Richardson, 1846); Pseudobagrus fulvidraco (Richardson, 1846)

= Tachysurus fulvidraco =

Species of fish

Tachysurus fulvidraco, the yellow catfish, is a species of bagrid catfish found in eastern Asia from Siberia to China, Korea, Vietnam, and Laos, where it can be found in lakes and river channels. It can reach a maximum length of 34.5 cm (13.6 in), weighing 3 kg (6 lb 10 oz), though it is much more commonly found to a length of 8 cm (3.1 in). It is a minor component of commercial fisheries.

== Parasites ==
A total of 11 species of helminths, including six species of digeneans, three species of nematodes, a species of cestode, and an acanthocephalan have been found in the stomach and intestines of T. fulvidraco:.

- Genarchopsis goppo
- Orientocreadium siluri
- Coitocoecum plagiorchis
- Echinoparyphium lingulatum
- Dollfustrema vaneyi
- Opisthorchis parasiluri
- Procamallanus fulvidraconis
- Spinitectus gigi
- Camallanus cotti
- Gangesia pseudobagri
- Hebsoma violentum
