= Stamford (CDP), Vermont =

Census-designated place in Vermont, United States

Stamford, Vermont
- Census-designated place
- Location within Vermont Location within the United States
- Coordinates: 42°45′18″N 73°03′29″W
- Country: United States
- State: Vermont
- County: Bennington
- Town: Stamford

Area
  - Total: 5.4 sq mi (13.9 km^{2})
  - Land: 5.4 sq mi (13.9 km^{2})
  - Water: 0 sq mi (0.0 km^{2})
- Elevation: 1,188 ft (362 m)
- Time zone: UTC-5 (Eastern (EST))
  - Summer (DST): UTC-4 (EDT)
- ZIP Code: 05352
- Area code: 802
- FIPS code: 50-69700
- GNIS feature ID: 2805709

Stamford is the primary village and a census-designated place (CDP) in the town of Stamford, Bennington County, Vermont, United States. It was first listed as a CDP prior to the 2020 census.

The village is in southern Bennington County, in the southern part of the town of Stamford. It is bordered to the south by the towns of Clarksburg and Florida in Berkshire County, Massachusetts. Vermont Routes 8 and 100 pass through the village as its Main Street, leading northeast together 7 miles (11 km) to Heartwellville. To the south, the road continues as Massachusetts Route 8, leading 5 miles (8 km) to North Adams, Massachusetts.

Stamford is in the valley of the North Branch of the Hoosic River, between the 3,000-foot-high (910 m) Hoosac Range to the east and the more gently rising Green Mountains to the west.
