= Readsboro (CDP), Vermont =

Census-designated place in Vermont, United States

Readsboro, Vermont
- Census-designated place
- Location within Vermont Location within the United States
- Coordinates: 42°46′06″N 72°56′56″W
- Country: United States
- State: Vermont
- County: Bennington
- Town: Readsboro

Area
  - Total: 1.24 sq mi (3.21 km^{2})
  - Land: 1.23 sq mi (3.18 km^{2})
  - Water: 0.012 sq mi (0.03 km^{2})
- Elevation: 1,329 ft (405 m)

Population (2020)
  - Total: 297
- Time zone: UTC-5 (Eastern (EST))
  - Summer (DST): UTC-4 (EDT)
- ZIP Code: 05350
- Area code: 802
- FIPS code: 50-58525
- GNIS feature ID: 2584793

Readsboro is the primary village and a census-designated place (CDP) in the town of Readsboro, Bennington County, Vermont, United States. As of the 2020 census, it had a population of 297, out of 702 in the entire town of Readsboro.

The community is in southeastern Bennington County, in the southeastern part of the town of Readsboro, mainly on the west side of the Deerfield River, a south-flowing tributary of the Connecticut River. Vermont Route 100 passes through the village, leading northwest 5 miles (8 km) to Vermont Route 8 at Heartwellville and east 8 miles (13 km) to Vermont Route 112 at Jacksonville. Bennington, the county seat, is 24 miles (39 km) to the northwest via Routes 100, 8, and 9.
