= Vermont Route 9 =

State highway in Bennington and Windham counties in Vermont, United States

Vermont Route 9
- Molly Stark Trail
- VT 9 highlighted in red

Route information
- Maintained by VTrans
- Length: 46.959 mi (75.573 km)

Major junctions
- West end: NY 7 at the New York state line in Hoosick, NY
- US 7 in Bennington; VT 279 in Bennington; VT 8 in Searsburg; VT 100 in Wilmington; I-91 in Brattleboro; US 5 / VT 30 in Brattleboro; I-91 / US 5 in Brattleboro
- East end: NH 9 at the New Hampshire state line in West Chesterfield, NH

Location
- Country: United States
- State: Vermont
- Counties: Bennington, Windham

Highway system
- State highways in Vermont
← VT 8A	→ VT 10
← Route 8	N.E.	→ Route 10

Vermont Route 9 (VT 9) is a state highway in the U.S. state of Vermont. The highway runs 46.957 miles (75.570 km) from the New York state line in Bennington, where it continues west as New York State Route 7 (NY 7), to the New Hampshire state line at the Connecticut River in Brattleboro, where the highway continues as New Hampshire Route 9 (NH 9). VT 9 is the primary east–west highway of Bennington and Windham counties in southern Vermont. The highway connects Southern Vermont's primary towns of Bennington and Brattleboro via its crossing of the Green Mountains. VT 9 also connects those towns with Troy, New York, and Keene, New Hampshire, via the connecting highways in those states. The highway also intersects three major north–south routes: U.S. Route 7 (US 7) in Bennington and Interstate 91 (I-91) and US 5 in Brattleboro.

== Route description ==
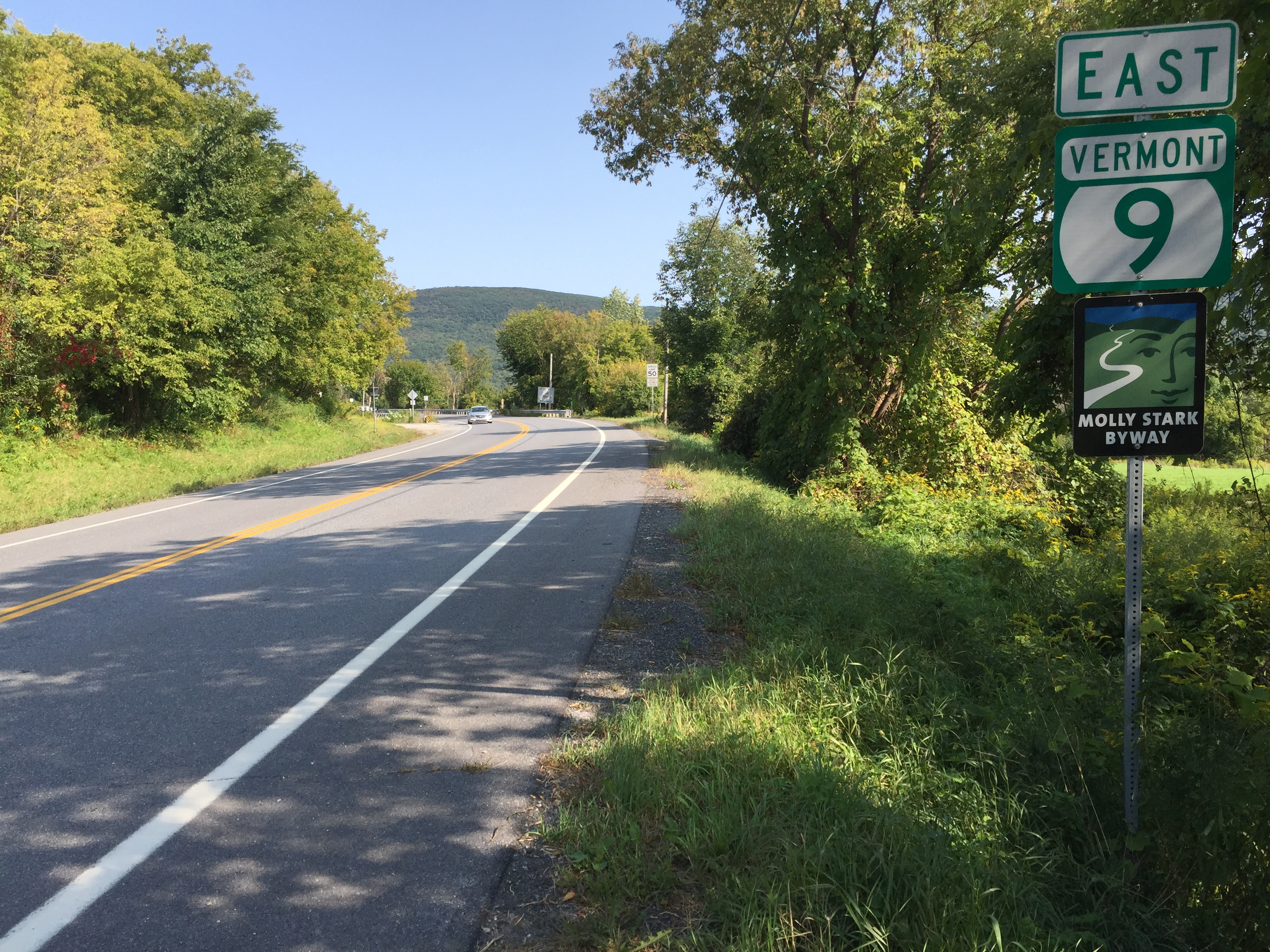
View east at the west end of VT 9 at NY 7 at the New York border in Bennington

VT 9 begins at the New York state line in the town of Bennington in western Bennington County. The highway continues west as NY 7 (Mapletown Road) toward Hoosick and Troy. A short distance west of the state line, NY 7 has a junction with the west end of the Bennington Bypass (VT 279 in Vermont), a two-lane freeway that allows VT 9 traffic to bypass the center of town. VT 9 heads east as West Road and passes south of William H. Morse State Airport and has a pair of sharp curves as it passes through Old Bennington, which is south of the Bennington Battle Monument and north of Southern Vermont College. The highway continues as Main Street to downtown Bennington, where it intersects US 7, which follows North Street and South Street in the respective directions. East of downtown, VT 9 meets the eastern end of VT 279 at a half–single-point urban interchange. The highway leaves Bennington along Woodford Road and crosses and begins to parallel the Walloomsac River as the river and highway enter the Green Mountains.

VT 9 continues along the river into the town of Woodford. The highway has a curvaceous ascent along the City Stream branch of the river to the town center of Woodford; during the ascent, the highway intersects the Appalachian Trail and Long Trail. VT 9 reaches the source of City Stream at Big Pond and summits the Green Mountains. The highway meets the northern end of VT 8 in Searsburg, where the highway descends from the main range of the Green Mountains and begins to parallel the Deerfield River. VT 9 enters Windham County and the town of Wilmington just west of the Harriman Reservoir. The highway continues along the North Branch of the river into the town center of Wilmington, where the highway intersects VT 100 (North Main Street). VT 9 and VT 100 run concurrently follow Beaver Brook to their split east of the town center. The highway ascends Hogback Mountain along Beaver Brook to the stream's source. The route passes Molly Stark State Park and enters the town of Marlboro west of the summit. VT 9 passes to the north of the center of Marlboro and enters the valley of Whetstone Brook, which the highway follows into the town of Brattleboro.

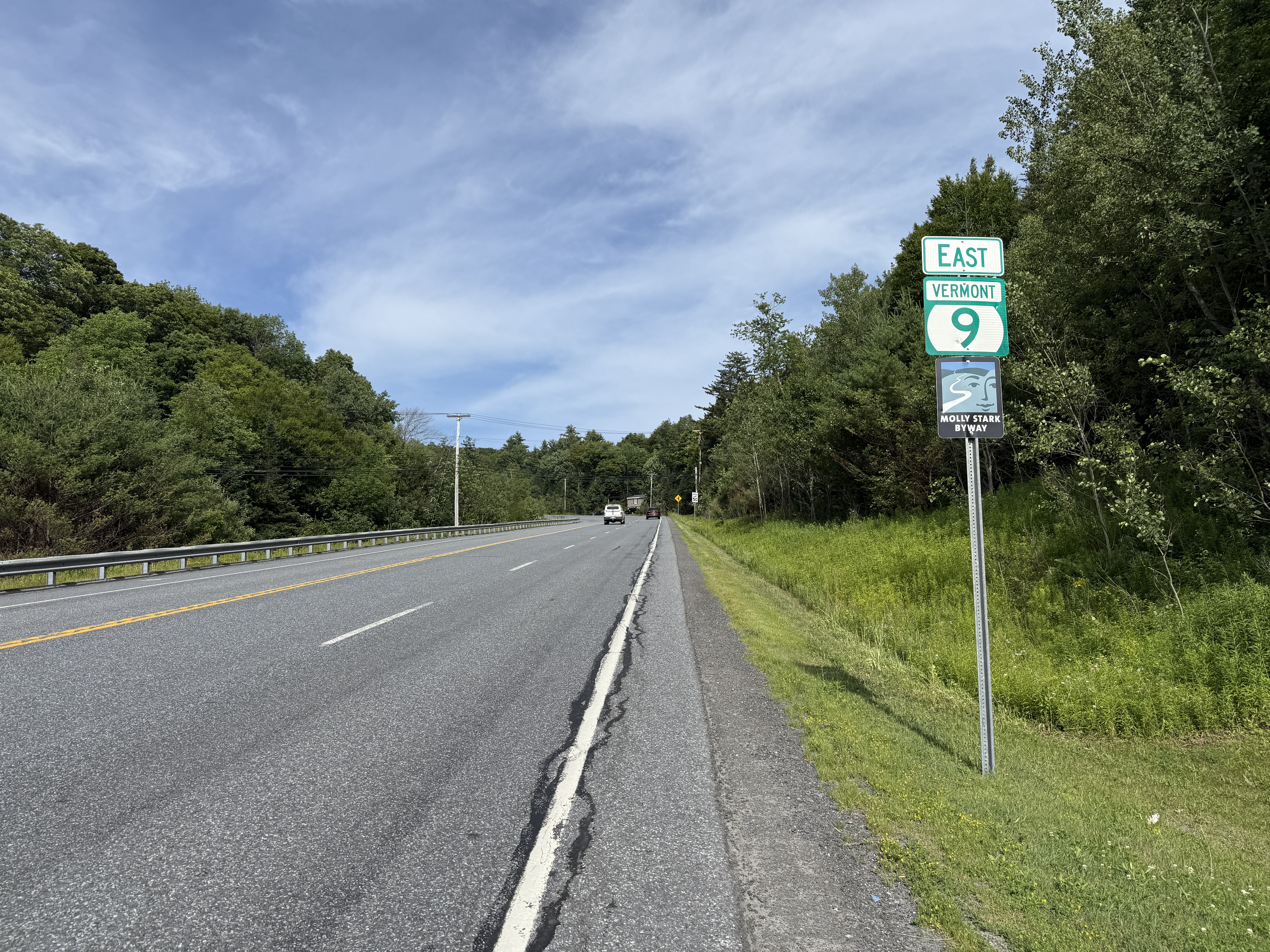
VT 9 eastbound in Wilmington

VT 9's name becomes Western Avenue as it passes through the community of West Brattleboro. The highway has an elongated partial cloverleaf interchange with I-91 west of downtown Brattleboro. The route enters the downtown area along High Street, then turns north and joins US 5 on Main Street. VT 9 and US 5 meet the southern end of VT 30 at a circle around part of the Brattleboro Retreat property formed by Linden Street, Putney Road, and Park Place. VT 9 and US 5 leave the circle along Putney Road and cross the West River. The state highway and the U.S. Highway pass through a commercial area and diverge at a four-legged roundabout. The west leg of the roundabout is a connector to a trumpet interchange with I-91. VT 9 heads east along Chesterfield Road, which passes under the New England Central Railroad on its way to the New Hampshire state line at the Connecticut River, where the highway continues as NH 9 (Franklin Pierce Highway) toward Keene. The highway crosses the river by the United States Navy Seabees Bridge, a through arch bridge that parallels another through arch bridge for pedestrians and cyclists, the Justice Harlan Fiske Stone Bridge.

VT 9 is known as the Molly Stark Trail (or Molly Stark Byway) throughout its course, named after Molly Stark, the wife of General John Stark of the American Revolutionary War. The highway is a part of the National Highway System from the New York state line to I-91, and again from I-91 and US 5 to the Connecticut River. I-91 bridges the National Highway System gap in VT 9 and forms a bypass of Brattleboro for the state highway.

== History ==

VT 9 follows the course of the 1920s era New England Interstate Route 9, a part of the New England road marking system that ran from Bennington, through Concord, New Hampshire, to Wells, Maine.

== Major intersections ==
County	Location	mi	km	Destinations	Notes
Bennington	Bennington	0.000	0.000	NY 7 west – Troy	Western terminus; New York state line
Bennington	Bennington	4.397	7.076	US 7 (North Street/South Street)	
Bennington	Bennington	5.737	9.233	VT 279 west to US 7 north – Manchester, Troy NY, Rutland	Eastern terminus of VT 279
Bennington	Searsburg	18.266	29.396	VT 8 south – Heartwellville, Readsboro, Stamford	Northern terminus of VT 8
Windham	Wilmington	25.070	40.346	VT 100 north (North Main Street) – East Jamaica	Western end of concurrency with VT 100
Windham	Wilmington	26.140	42.068	VT 100 south – Jacksonville, Whitingham	Eastern end of concurrency with VT 100
Windham	Brattleboro	43.298– 43.350	69.681– 69.765	I-91 – Springfield MA, White River Junction, Keene NH	Exit 2 on I-91; partial cloverleaf interchange
Windham	Brattleboro	44.416	71.481	US 5 south (Main Street)	Western end of concurrency with US 5
Windham	Brattleboro	44.577	71.740	VT 30 north (Linden Street) – Newfane, Townshend, Manchester	Southern terminus of VT 30
Windham	Brattleboro	46.725	75.197	US 5 north (Putney Road) – Bellows Falls; I-91 – Massachusetts	Eastern end of concurrency with US 5; intersection with connector ( VT 9090) to I-91 Exit 3; roundabout
Windham	Brattleboro	46.959	75.573	NH 9 east – Keene	Continuation into New Hampshire at the Connecticut River
1.000 mi = 1.609 km; 1.000 km = 0.621 mi: Concurrency terminus
