= Second Amendment sanctuary =

U.S. jurisdictions resolved to not enforce certain gun control laws

States and counties that have passed Second Amendment sanctuary (or other pro-Second Amendment) laws or resolutions as of February 17, 2023. Localities within counties that have adopted such resolutions are not displayed in this map. County level State level Both state and county levels

A Second Amendment sanctuary, also known as a gun sanctuary, is a state, county, or locality in the United States that has adopted laws or resolutions to prohibit or impede the enforcement of certain gun control measures which are perceived to violate the Second Amendment, such as universal background checks, high capacity magazine bans, assault weapon bans, or red flag laws. Although other jurisdictions had previously adopted legislation now characterized as creating Second Amendment sanctuaries, the Carroll County, Maryland Board of Commissioners is thought to be the first body to explicitly use the term "sanctuary" in its resolution on May 22, 2013 and Effingham County, Illinois County Board is thought to have popularized the term on April 16, 2018.

Examples of the resolutions include the Second Amendment Preservation Ordinance in Oregon and the Second Amendment Protection Act in Kansas. The term "sanctuary" draws its inspiration from the immigration sanctuary cities movement of jurisdictions that have resolved to not assist federal enforcement of immigration laws against illegal immigrants.

== State laws ==
Although some of the state laws listed below were approved prior to the adoption of the term "sanctuary", they are now frequently characterized as part of the Second Amendment sanctuary movement. Montana was the first state to attempt passage of such bills in 2005, eventually passing in 2009, though it ended up being struck down by the Ninth Circuit Court of Appeals.

=== Alabama ===
On April 13, 2022, Governor Kay Ivey signed the Alabama Second Amendment Preservation Act (SB 2). The full text may be read here.

=== Alaska ===
On July 9, 2010, Governor Sean Parnell signed the Alaska Firearms Freedom Act (HB 186), declaring that certain firearms and accessories are exempt from federal regulation. The text can be read here. On September 10, 2013, Governor Parnell signed HB 69, which amended and expanded HB 186. The text can be read here.

=== Arizona ===
On April 5, 2010, Governor Jan Brewer signed HB 2307 which exempted intrastate firearms from federal law. On April 6, 2021, Governor Doug Ducey signed the 2nd Amendment Firearm Freedom Act (HB 2111), which prohibits the state and all political subdivisions from assisting in the enforcement of federal firearm laws and regulations when they are inconsistent with state law.

On June 22, 2021, the city of Tucson passed a resolution to ignore the statewide Second Amendment sanctuary law.

=== Arkansas ===
On April 26, 2021, Governor Asa Hutchinson vetoed SB298, The Arkansas Sovereignty Act Of 2021. The Senate promptly overrode the governor's veto later the same day. The House decided to postpone its veto override vote and instead, on April 27, passed HB1957, a less expansive version of the bill; the Senate then passed it as well shortly after midnight on April 28. The governor signed it on April 29, 2021.

=== Idaho ===
On March 19, 2014, Governor Butch Otter signed SB 1332 to protect Idaho law enforcement officers from being directed by the federal government to violate citizens' rights under Section 11, Article I of the Idaho Constitution. The text can be read here. Previously, HJM 3 was passed in 2009. That text can be read here.

=== Kansas ===
On April 16, 2013, Governor Sam Brownback signed the Second Amendment Protection Act. The text can be read here.

=== Kentucky ===
On March 28, 2023, Governor Andy Beshear didn't either sign nor veto HB 153, upon which it proceeded to the Secretary of State Michael Adams and then became law without the Governor's signature. The text can be read here.

=== Missouri ===
On June 12, 2021, Governor Mike Parson signed the Second Amendment Preservation Act (HB 85), which will "reject any attempt by the federal government to circumvent the fundamental right Missourians have to keep and bear arms to protect themselves and their property." A similar bill had been passed in 2013, but was vetoed; a veto override passed in the House but failed by 1 vote in the Senate. In February 2023, a federal judge struck down the Second Amendment Preservation Act as a violation of the Supremacy Clause of the United States Constitution.

=== Montana ===
On February 18, 2021, Governor Greg Gianforte signed HB 0258 banning the enforcement of federal bans on firearms, magazines, or ammunition. The bill applies retroactively to January 1, 2021. Previously, Montana had passed the Montana Firearms Freedom Act (HB 246) in 2009 which exempted from federal law firearms manufactured within the state and that remain in the state. The law was subsequently struck down by the Ninth Circuit Court of Appeals.

=== Nebraska ===
On April 14, 2021, Governor Pete Ricketts signed a proclamation that designated Nebraska as a "Second Amendment Sanctuary State." This proclamation is merely symbolic and does not carry the weight of law.

=== New Hampshire ===
On June 24, 2022, Governor Chris Sununu signed HB 1178, an act "prohibiting the state from enforcing any federal statute, regulation, or Presidential Executive Order that restricts or regulates the right of the people to keep and bear arms."

=== North Dakota ===
On April 22, 2021, Governor Doug Burgum signed HB 1383, which limits enforcing or assisting in the enforcement of federal firearms laws enacted after January 1, 2021, that are more restrictive than state law. On April 26, 2021, Burgum also signed a proclamation which designated North Dakota as a "Second Amendment Sanctuary State."

=== Oklahoma ===
On April 26, 2021, Governor Kevin Stitt signed the Second Amendment Sanctuary State Act (SB 631) which prevents the confiscation or surrender of firearms, gun accessories, or ammunition from law-abiding Oklahomans, protecting the right to keep and bear arms guaranteed by the United States Constitution. In May 2020, Oklahoma became the first of four states to have enacted an anti-red flag law. The law specifically "prohibits the state or any city, county or political subdivision from enacting red flag laws."

=== South Carolina ===
On May 17, 2021, Governor Henry McMaster signed H.3094, also known as the Open Carry With Training Act. Section 9 of H.3094 notes "the state of South Carolina and its political subdivisions cannot be compelled" to enforce federal laws that regulate an individual's right to carry concealable weapons openly or concealed. Any such law must first be evaluated by the Attorney General who shall issue a written opinion on if it can be enforced.

=== South Dakota ===
On March 12, 2010, Governor Mike Rounds signed SB 89. However, Sanctuarycounties.com, a pro-sanctuary county website tracking the movement does not consider this a Second Amendment sanctuary law, claiming it is more geared towards protecting firearm and ammunition manufacturers within the state from federal regulation, rather than the Second Amendment rights of state citizens.

=== Tennessee ===
On May 26, 2021, Governor Bill Lee signed the "Tennessee Second Amendment Sanctuary Act" (SB 1335) which prohibits Tennessee or any of its subdivisions from enforcing "any law, treaty, executive order, rule, or regulation of the United States government that violates the Second Amendment". Previously, the Tennessee Firearms Freedom Act was passed in 2009.

=== Texas ===
On June 16, 2021, Governor Greg Abbott signed the Second Amendment Sanctuary Act (87(R) HB 2622). The Act went into effect September 1, 2021, and prohibits Texas agencies from assisting the federal government in enforcing federal gun-control laws passed after January 19, 2021. The text of the Act can be read here.

=== Utah ===
On February 26, 2010, Governor Gary Herbert signed the Utah State-made Firearms Protection Act (SB 11). Like the South Dakota bill, Sanctuarycounties.com does not consider this a Second Amendment sanctuary law, claiming it's more focused towards protecting firearm and ammunition manufacturers within the state than the rights of state citizens.

=== West Virginia ===
On April 27, 2021, Governor Jim Justice signed the Second Amendment Preservation and Anti-Federal Commandeering Act (HB 2694) which prohibits the federal commandeering of employees and agencies of the state for the purpose of enforcing federal firearms laws. HB 2694 also prohibits police departments and officers from executing red flag laws or federal search warrants on firearms, accessories, or ammunition of law abiding persons.

=== Wyoming ===
On March 11, 2010, Governor Dave Freudenthal signed the Wyoming Firearms Freedom Act. The text can be read here.

== Local laws ==
=== Arkansas ===
4 out of 75 counties have adopted Second Amendment sanctuary (or other pro-Second Amendment) resolutions:

- Cleburne
- Crawford
- Independence
- Scott

=== Arizona ===
5 out of 15 counties and 1 city have adopted Second Amendment sanctuary (or other pro-Second Amendment) resolutions:

- Apache
- La Paz
- Maricopa
- Mohave (plus Bullhead City)
- Yavapai

=== California ===
5 out of 58 counties and 1 city have adopted Second Amendment sanctuary (or other pro-Second Amendment) resolutions:

- Needles City
- Siskiyou
- Shasta
- Tehama
- Fresno
- Madera

=== Colorado ===
39 out of 64 counties, 3 cities, and 4 towns have adopted Second Amendment sanctuary (or other pro-Second Amendment) resolutions:

- Alamosa
- Archuleta
- Baca
- Bent
- Cheyenne
- Commerce City
- Conejos
- Crowley
- Custer (plus Silver Cliff Town)
- Delta
- Dolores
- Douglas
- El Paso (plus Monument Town)
- Elbert
- Fremont (plus Cañon City)
- Garfield
- Huerfano
- Jackson
- Kiowa
- Kit Carson
- Las Animas
- Lincoln
- Logan
- Mesa
- Mineral
- Moffat (plus Craig City)
- Montezuma
- Montrose
- Morgan
- Otero
- Park
- Phillips (plus Haxtun Town)
- Prowers
- Rio Blanco
- Rio Grande
- Sedgwick
- Teller
- Washington
- Weld (plus Milliken Town)
- Yuma

=== Florida ===
38 out of 67 counties, 3 cities, and 1 town have adopted Second Amendment sanctuary (or other pro-Second Amendment) resolutions.

In 2013, all 67 sheriffs in Florida had signed a letter saying that they will not enforce laws that violate the Constitution or infringe on the rights of the people to own firearms.

- Bay (plus Panama City Beach City)
- Bradford
- Calhoun
- Citrus
- Clay
- Collier (plus Marco Island City)
- Columbia
- DeSoto
- Dixie
- Escambia
- Gilchrist
- Gulf
- Hendry
- Hernando
- Highlands
- Holmes
- Jackson
- Jefferson
- Lafayette
- Lake
- Lee
- Levy (plus Bronson Town)
- Madison
- Marion
- Manatee
- Nassau
- Newberry City
- Okaloosa
- Okeechobee
- Polk
- Putnam
- Santa Rosa
- St. Johns
- Sumter
- Suwannee
- Taylor
- Union
- Wakulla
- Walton

=== Georgia ===
23 out of 159 counties and 1 city have adopted Second Amendment sanctuary (or other pro-Second Amendment) resolutions:

- Atkinson
- Banks
- Barrow
- Bulloch
- Coweta
- Fannin
- Floyd
- Franklin
- Gilmer
- Habersham
- Haralson
- Hart (plus Hartwell City)
- Jackson
- McIntosh
- Meriwether
- Murray
- Pike
- Polk
- Rabun
- Spalding
- Stephens
- Walton
- Whitfield

=== Illinois ===
68 out of 102 counties, 2 cities, and 4 townships have adopted Second Amendment sanctuary (or other pro-Second Amendment) resolutions:

- Adams
- Bond
- Boone
- Brown
- Bureau
- Calhoun
- Christian
- Clark
- Clay
- Clinton
- Coles
- Crawford
- Cumberland
- Douglas
- Edgar
- Edwards
- Effingham
- Farmer City
- Fayette
- Ford
- Franklin
- Gallatin
- Greene
- Hamilton
- Hancock
- Hardin
- Henderson
- Henry
- Iroquois
- Jasper
- Jefferson
- Jersey
- Johnson
- LaSalle
- Lawrence
- Livingston
- Logan
- Macon
- Macoupin
- Madison
- Marion
- Massac
- McDonough
- McHenry Township
- Mercer
- Monroe
- Montgomery (plus Hillsboro City)
- Moultrie
- Morgan
- O'Fallon Township
- Ogle
- Perry
- Piatt
- Pike
- Plainfield Township
- Pope
- Pulaski
- Randolph
- Richland
- Saline
- Schuyler
- Shelby
- St. Clair Township
- Stark
- Tazewell
- Union
- Wabash
- Washington
- Wayne
- White
- Williamson
- Woodford

=== Indiana ===
9 out of 92 counties have adopted Second Amendment sanctuary (or other pro-Second Amendment) resolutions:

- Cass
- Crawford
- Franklin
- Gibson
- Grant
- Jennings
- Morgan
- Pike
- Switzerland

=== Kansas ===
1 out of 105 counties have adopted Second Amendment sanctuary (or other pro-Second Amendment) resolutions:

- Cherokee

=== Kentucky ===
115 out of 120 counties and 6 cities have adopted Second Amendment sanctuary (or other pro-Second Amendment) resolutions:

- Adair
- Allen
- Anderson
- Barren
- Bath
- Bell (plus Pineville City)
- Boone
- Bourbon
- Boyd
- Boyle
- Bracken
- Breathitt
- Breckinridge
- Bullitt (plus Mount Washington City and Shepherdsville City)
- Butler
- Caldwell
- Calloway
- Campbell
- Carlisle
- Carroll
- Carter
- Casey
- Christian
- Clark
- Clay
- Clinton
- Crittenden
- Cumberland
- Daviess
- Edmonson
- Elliott
- Estill
- Floyd
- Fleming
- Franklin
- Gallatin
- Garrard
- Grant
- Graves
- Grayson
- Green
- Greenup
- Hancock
- Harlan
- Harrison
- Hart
- Henderson
- Henry
- Hickman
- Hopkins
- Jackson
- Jessamine
- Johnson
- Kenton
- Knott
- Knox
- LaRue
- Laurel
- Lawrence
- Lee
- Leslie
- Letcher
- Lewis
- Lincoln (plus Crab Orchard City)
- Livingston
- Logan
- Lyon
- Madison
- Magoffin
- Marion
- Marshall
- Martin
- Mason
- McCreary
- McLean
- Meade
- Menifee
- Mercer (plus Burgin City and Harrodsburg City)
- Metcalfe
- Monroe
- Montgomery
- Morgan
- Muhlenberg
- Nelson
- Nicholas
- Ohio
- Oldham
- Owen
- Owsley
- Pendleton
- Perry
- Pike
- Powell
- Pulaski
- Robertson
- Rockcastle
- Rowan
- Russell
- Scott
- Shelby
- Simpson
- Spencer
- Taylor
- Todd
- Trigg
- Trimble
- Union
- Warren
- Washington
- Wayne
- Webster
- Whitley
- Wolfe
- Woodford

=== Louisiana ===
6 out of 64 parishes has adopted Second Amendment sanctuary (or other pro-Second Amendment) resolutions:

- Grant
- Livingston
- Pointe Coupee
- Rapides
- St. Mary
- Winn

=== Maine ===
1 out of 16 counties and 1 town have adopted Second Amendment sanctuary (or other pro-Second Amendment) resolutions:

- Piscataquis County, Maine
- Paris Town

=== Maryland ===
6 out of 23 counties have adopted Second Amendment sanctuary (or other pro-Second Amendment) resolutions:

- Allegany
- Calvert
- Carroll
- Cecil
- Harford
- St. Mary's

=== Michigan ===
51 out of 83 counties, 1 city, and 6 townships have adopted Second Amendment sanctuary (or other pro-Second Amendment) resolutions. On February 25, 2020, the Michigan House of Representatives voted to reaffirm the Second Amendment. The text can be read here.

- Alcona
- Allegan
- Alpena
- Antrim
- Arenac
- Bay
- Berrien
- Branch
- Cass
- Charlevoix
- Cheboygan
- Chippewa
- Clinton
- Delta
- Dickinson
- Eaton
- Emmet
- Gladwin
- Grand Traverse
- Hillsdale
- Holton Township
- Huron
- Ionia
- Iosco
- Iron
- Jackson
- Kalkaska
- Lake
- Lapeer
- Livingston
- Mackinac
- Macomb
- Marquette
- Mason
- Mecosta
- Menominee
- Missaukee
- Monroe
- Montmorency (plus Briley Township)
- Oceana
- Ogemaw
- Osceola
- Oscoda (plus Big Creek Township, Comins Township, and Greenwood Township)
- Otsego
- Presque Isle
- Sanilac
- Schoolcraft
- Shiawassee
- St. Clair
- Stronach Township
- Tuscola
- Van Buren
- Wexford (plus Manton City)

=== Minnesota ===
17 out of 87 counties have adopted Second Amendment sanctuary (or other pro-Second Amendment) resolutions:

- Becker
- Clearwater
- Chisago
- Crow Wing
- Faribault
- Hubbard
- Kanabec
- Marshall
- McLeod
- Meeker
- Mille Lacs
- Pennington
- Red Lake
- Roseau
- Todd
- Wadena
- Wright

=== Mississippi ===
9 out of 82 counties have adopted Second Amendment sanctuary, safe haven, or other pro-Second Amendment resolutions:

- Alcorn
- DeSoto
- Jackson
- Lawrence
- Lee
- Lincoln
- Madison
- Tishomingo
- Union

=== Missouri ===
1 out of 114 counties have adopted Second Amendment sanctuary, safe haven, or other pro-Second Amendment resolutions:

- Newton

=== Nebraska ===
4 out of 93 counties have adopted Second Amendment sanctuary (or other pro-Second Amendment) resolutions:

- Cherry
- Cheyenne
- Morrill
- Scotts Bluff

=== Nevada ===
10 out of 16 counties have adopted Second Amendment sanctuary (or other pro-Second Amendment) resolutions.

All 17 sheriffs in Nevada (16 county and 1 Carson City) and have signed a letter expressing their support for the Second Amendment.

- Douglas
- Elko
- Eureka
- Humboldt
- Lander
- Lincoln
- Lyon
- Nye
- Pershing
- White Pine

=== New Jersey ===
7 out of 21 counties, 25 townships, and 5 boroughs (30 of 565 total municipalities) have adopted Second Amendment sanctuary (or other pro-Second Amendment) resolutions:

- Atlantic (plus Egg Harbor Township)
- Cape May (plus Dennis Township, Lower Township, Middle Township, and Upper Township)
- Commercial Township
- Deerfield Township
- Downe Township
- Franklin Township (Gloucester County)
- Lawrence Township (Cumberland County)
- Maurice River Township
- Monmouth (plus Howell Township)
- Ocean (plus Berkeley Township and Little Egg Harbor Township)
- Salem (plus Alloway Township, Lower Alloways Creek Township, Pennsville Township, and Upper Pittsgrove Township)
- Stow Creek Township
- Sussex (plus Branchville Borough, Franklin Borough, Hamburg Borough, Hopatcong Borough, Montague Township, Stillwater Township, and Sussex Borough)
- Tabernacle Township
- Warren (plus Oxford Township, Phillipsburg Town, and Washington Township)
- West Milford Township

=== New Mexico ===
26 out of 33 counties, 6 cities, and 1 town have adopted Second Amendment sanctuary (or other pro-Second Amendment) resolutions; Taos initially passed a resolution but later repealed it.

30 out of 33 county sheriffs have signed a letter by the New Mexico Sheriffs Association vowing to not assist in enforcing certain gun control.

- Catron
- Chaves (plus Roswell City)
- Cibola
- Colfax
- Curry
- De Baca
- Eddy (plus Carlsbad City)
- Grant
- Harding
- Hidalgo
- Lea
- Lincoln
- Luna
- McKinley
- Mora
- Otero (plus Alamogordo City)
- Quay
- Rio Arriba (plus Española City)
- Roosevelt
- San Juan (plus Bloomfield City, Farmington City, and Kirtland Town)
- Sandoval
- Sierra
- Socorro
- Torrance
- Union
- Valencia

=== New York ===
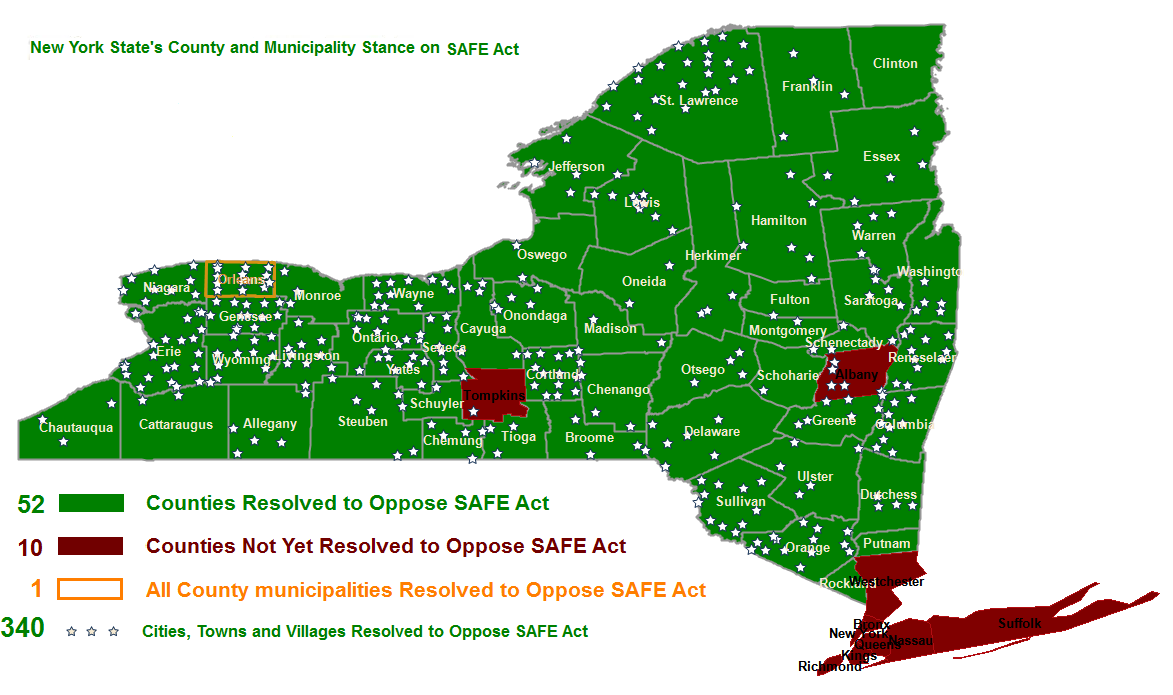
County opposition to SAFE Act

The SAFE Act was passed in 2013. After passage, New York counties started passing resolutions opposing the SAFE Act. There are currently 52 out of 62 counties with such resolutions. The New York State Sheriffs Association joined a lawsuit to block the law as an amicus curiae.

1 out of 62 counties and 2 towns have adopted Second Amendment sanctuary (or other pro-Second Amendment) resolutions:

- Broadalbin Town
- Grand Island Town
- Wyoming

=== North Carolina ===
68 out of 100 counties, 1 city, and 2 towns have adopted Second Amendment sanctuary (or other pro-Second Amendment) resolutions:

- Alamance
- Alexander
- Alleghany
- Anson
- Ashe
- Avery
- Beaufort
- Bladen
- Brunswick
- Burke
- Cabarrus
- Caldwell
- Camden
- Carteret
- Caswell
- Catawba
- Cherokee
- Chowan
- Clay
- Cleveland
- Columbus
- Craven
- Currituck
- Dare
- Davidson (plus Midway Town)
- Davie
- Forsyth
- Franklin
- Gaston
- Gates
- Graham
- Granville
- Harnett
- Haywood
- Henderson
- Iredell
- Johnston
- Jones
- Lee
- Lenoir
- Lincoln
- Madison
- Martin
- McDowell
- Mitchell
- Montgomery
- Moore
- Onslow
- Pamlico
- Pasquotank
- Person
- Pitt
- Polk
- Randolph
- Richmond
- Robeson
- Rockingham
- Rowan (plus China Grove City)
- Rutherford
- Stanly
- Stokes (plus King Town)
- Surry
- Union
- Wayne
- Wilkes
- Wilson
- Yadkin
- Yancey

=== Ohio ===
25 out of 88 counties and 3 township have adopted Second Amendment sanctuary (or other pro-Second Amendment) resolutions:

- Adams
- Brown
- Clermont
- Clinton
- Coshocton
- Gallia
- Guernsey
- Highland
- Hocking
- Huron
- Jackson
- Jackson Township (Perry County)
- Knox
- Lawrence
- Licking
- Marion
- Meigs
- Morgan (plus Deerfield Township)
- Morrow
- Muskingum
- Pickaway
- Pike
- Preble
- Seneca
- Scioto
- Vinton
- Wheeling Township (Belmont County)

=== Oklahoma ===
26 out of 77 counties have adopted Second Amendment sanctuary (or other pro-Second Amendment) resolutions:

- Atoka
- Bryan
- Caddo
- Canadian
- Carter
- Choctaw
- Cimarron
- Coal
- Cotton
- Grady
- Haskell
- Johnston
- Kiowa
- Latimer
- Le Flore
- Lincoln
- Logan
- Major
- Marshall
- McCurtain
- Osage
- Ottawa
- Pittsburg
- Pushmataha
- Rogers
- Stephens

=== Oregon ===
24 out of 36 counties and 1 city have adopted Second Amendment sanctuary (or other pro-Second Amendment) resolutions:

- Baker
- Clackamas
- Columbia
- Coos
- Crook
- Curry
- Douglas
- Grant
- Harney
- Jefferson
- Josephine
- Klamath
- Lake
- Lane
- Linn
- Malheur
- Marion
- Morrow (plus Lexington City)
- Polk
- Tillamook
- Umatilla
- Union
- Wallowa
- Wheeler

=== Pennsylvania ===
3 out of 67 counties and 2 townships have adopted Second Amendment sanctuary (or other pro-Second Amendment) resolutions:

- Bradford
- Buffalo Township (Union County)
- Cambria
- New Sewickley Township
- Huntingdon
- West Manheim Township

=== Rhode Island ===
0 out of 8 cities and 10 out of 31 towns have adopted Second Amendment sanctuary (or other pro-Second Amendment) resolutions; while Rhode Island has 5 counties, there is no local government at that level.

- Burrillville
- Coventry
- Foster
- Glocester
- Hopkinton
- Richmond
- Scituate
- Tiverton
- West Greenwich
- West Warwick

=== South Carolina ===
3 out of 46 counties have adopted Second Amendment sanctuary (or other pro-Second Amendment) resolutions:

- Cherokee
- Kershaw
- Pickens

=== Tennessee ===
53 out of 95 counties, 1 city, and 1 town have adopted Second Amendment sanctuary (or other pro-Second Amendment) resolutions:

- Anderson
- Benton
- Blount
- Bradley
- Cannon
- Carter
- Cheatham
- Claiborne
- Cocke
- Cumberland
- Dyer
- Fayette
- Fentress
- Grainger
- Greene
- Grundy
- Hamblen
- Hancock
- Hardin
- Hawkins
- Henderson
- Henry
- Hickman
- Humphreys
- Jefferson (plus Dandridge Town)
- Johnson
- Lake
- Lewis
- Loudon
- Macon
- Madison
- Maury
- McMinn
- McNairy
- Meigs
- Monroe
- Overton
- Polk
- Roane
- Rutherford
- Scott
- Sequatchie
- Sevier
- Smith
- Sullivan
- Sumner
- Unicoi
- Van Buren
- Warren
- Washington
- Wayne
- White
- Wilson (plus Mount Juliet City)

=== Texas ===
77 out of 254 counties, 1 city, and 2 towns have adopted Second Amendment sanctuary (or other pro-Second Amendment) resolutions:

- Anderson
- Angelina
- Atascosa
- Bandera
- Bowie
- Brown
- Calhoun
- Callahan
- Cass
- Cherokee (plus Wells Town)
- Chester Town
- Clay
- Coke
- Coleman
- Collin
- Colorado
- Cooke
- Coryell
- Dallam
- Dawson
- Denton
- Eastland
- Edwards
- Ellis
- Erath
- Fannin
- Freestone
- Gonzales
- Grimes
- Hood
- Hopkins
- Houston
- Howard (plus Big Spring City)
- Hudspeth
- Hunt
- Hutchinson
- Jack
- Jackson
- Johnson
- Kaufman
- Kinney
- Knox
- Lamar
- Lavaca
- Leon
- Madison
- Marion
- McCulloch
- Milam
- Mitchell
- Montgomery
- Navarro
- Nolan
- Palo Pinto
- Panola
- Parker
- Pecos
- Presidio
- Rains
- Real
- Red River
- Rockwall
- Shackelford
- Shelby
- Smith
- Stephens
- Sterling
- Throckmorton
- Titus
- Upshur
- Van Zandt
- Victoria
- Walker
- Waller
- Washington
- Wise
- Wood
- Young

=== Utah ===
2 out of 29 counties have adopted Second Amendment sanctuary (or other pro-Second Amendment) resolutions:

- Uintah
- Utah

=== Vermont ===
0 out of 14 counties and 13 towns have adopted Second Amendment sanctuary (or other pro-Second Amendment) resolutions:

- Arlington Town
- Barre Town
- Clarendon Town
- Concord Town
- Derby Town
- Holland Town
- Irasburg Town
- Morgan Town
- Pittsford Town
- Poultney Town
- Pownal Town
- Searsburg Town
- Stamford Town

=== Virginia ===
91 out of 95 counties, 17 out of 38 independent cities, and 40 towns have adopted Second Amendment sanctuary (or other pro-Second Amendment) resolutions:

- Accomack (plus Chincoteague Town and Parksley Town)
- Alleghany (plus Clifton Forge Town)
- Amelia
- Amherst
- Appomattox
- Augusta
- Bath
- Bedford (plus Bedford Town)
- Bland
- Botetourt
- Bristol City
- Brunswick
- Buchanan
- Buckingham
- Buena Vista City
- Campbell (plus Altavista Town)
- Caroline (plus Bowling Green Town)
- Carroll
- Charlotte
- Charles City County
- Chesapeake City
- Chesterfield
- Clarke (plus Berryville Town)
- Colonial Heights City
- Covington City
- Craig
- Culpeper (plus Culpeper Town)
- Cumberland
- Dickenson
- Dinwiddie
- Essex (plus Tappahannock Town)
- Fauquier
- Floyd
- Fluvanna
- Franklin City
- Franklin County (plus Rocky Mount Town)
- Frederick
- Galax City
- Giles
- Gloucester
- Goochland
- Grayson
- Greene
- Greensville
- Halifax
- Hanover
- Henrico
- Henry
- Highland
- Hopewell City
- Isle of Wight
- James City County
- King and Queen
- King George
- King William
- Lancaster (plus White Stone Town)
- Lee
- Louisa (plus Mineral Town)
- Lovettsville Town
- Lunenburg
- Lynchburg City
- Madison
- Martinsville City
- Mathews
- Mecklenburg (plus Chase City Town)
- Middlesex
- Montgomery
- Nelson
- New Kent
- Northampton (plus Exmore Town)
- Northumberland
- Norton City
- Nottoway (plus Blackstone Town, Burkeville Town, and Crewe Town)
- Orange
- Page (plus Stanley Town)
- Patrick
- Pittsylvania
- Poquoson City
- Portsmouth City
- Powhatan
- Prince Edward
- Prince George
- Prince William
- Pulaski (plus Pulaski Town)
- Rappahannock
- Richmond County (plus Warsaw Town)
- Roanoke County (plus Vinton Town)
- Rockbridge (plus Goshen Town)
- Rockingham (plus Elkton Town and Grottoes Town)
- Russell
- Salem City
- Scott
- Scottsville Town
- Shenandoah (plus Mount Jackson, New Market Town, Strasburg Town, and Woodstock Town)
- Smyth (plus Chilhowie Town and Saltville Town)
- Southampton
- Spotsylvania
- Stafford
- Suffolk City
- Surry (plus Claremont Town)
- Sussex
- Tazewell (plus Bluefield Town and Cedar Bluff Town)
- Virginia Beach City
- Warren (plus Front Royal Town)
- Washington
- Waynesboro City
- Westmoreland
- Wise (plus Appalachia Town, Big Stone Gap Town, and Wise Town)
- Wythe (plus Rural Retreat Town)
- York

On December 19, 2019, at the request of Del. Jerrauld C. Jones (D-Norfolk), state Attorney General Mark Herring issued an advisory opinion indicating the sanctuary resolutions were null and void. A press release quoted him as saying: “When the General Assembly passes new gun safety laws they will be enforced, and they will be followed. These resolutions have no legal force, and they're just part of an effort by the gun lobby to stoke fear”. Del. Todd Gilbert (R-Shenandoah) claimed that Herring's recent opinion contradicted his 2014 stance "regarding the supremacy of state law over the preferences of the officials who must enforce them". Gilbert was referring to Herring's refusal to defend Virginia's Marshall-Newman Amendment, a voter-approved constitutional provision that prohibited same-sex marriages.

=== West Virginia ===
24 out of 55 counties, 3 cities, and 2 towns have adopted Second Amendment sanctuary (or other pro-Second Amendment) resolutions:

- Boone
- Cabell
- Calhoun
- Doddridge
- Fayette
- Harrison
- Lewis
- Logan (plus Logan City)
- Marshall
- McDowell
- Mercer
- Mineral (plus Keyser City)
- Mingo (plus Kermit Town)
- Monroe
- Nicholas
- Preston
- Putnam
- Randolph
- St. Albans City
- Tyler
- Upshur
- Wayne (plus Fort Gay Town)
- Wirt
- Wood
- Wyoming (plus Oceana Town)

=== Wisconsin ===
20 out of 72 counties and 1 city have adopted Second Amendment sanctuary (or other pro-Second Amendment) resolutions:

- Dodge
- Florence
- Grant
- Kenosha
- Lafayette
- Langlade
- Marquette
- Merrill City
- Monroe
- Oneida
- Ozaukee
- Polk
- Portage
- Rusk
- Sawyer
- Shawano
- Vilas
- Washburn
- Washington
- Waukesha
- Wood

== Local law enforcement resistance ==
=== Illinois ===
Besides the Second Amendment sanctuaries listed above by law, sheriffs of 26 counties and the police chief of 1 municipality listed below have vowed not to enforce any part of gun control legislation HB 5471 or the "Protect Illinois Communities Act" signed in 2023. This law prohibits the sale of certain semiautomatic firearms that it defines as assault weapons, as well as high-capacity magazines. Assault weapons already owned are legal to possess if registered with the state police by January 1, 2024.

- Carroll
- Cass
- DeKalb
- DeWitt
- DuPage
- Fulton
- Grundy
- Jefferson
- Jo Daviess
- Kane
- Kankakee
- Kendall
- Knox
- Lee
- Lincoln City
- Marshall
- McHenry
- McLean
- Menard
- Peoria
- Putnam
- Rock Island
- Sangamon
- St. Clair
- Stephenson
- Whiteside
- Winnebago

=== Washington ===
County sheriffs in 24 of the 39 counties and the police chief of one city have vowed to not enforce parts or all of the 2018 gun control ballot measure I-1639 while it is being challenged in court:

- Adams
- Benton
- Chelan
- Columbia
- Cowlitz
- Douglas
- Ferry (plus Republic City)
- Franklin
- Garfield
- Grant
- Grays Harbor
- Kittitas
- Klickitat
- Lewis
- Lincoln
- Mason
- Okanogan
- Pacific
- Pend Oreille
- Skamania
- Spokane
- Stevens
- Wahkiakum
- Washougal
- Yakima
