= Becket Center Historic District =

Historic district in Massachusetts, United States

- U.S. National Register of Historic Places
- U.S. Historic district
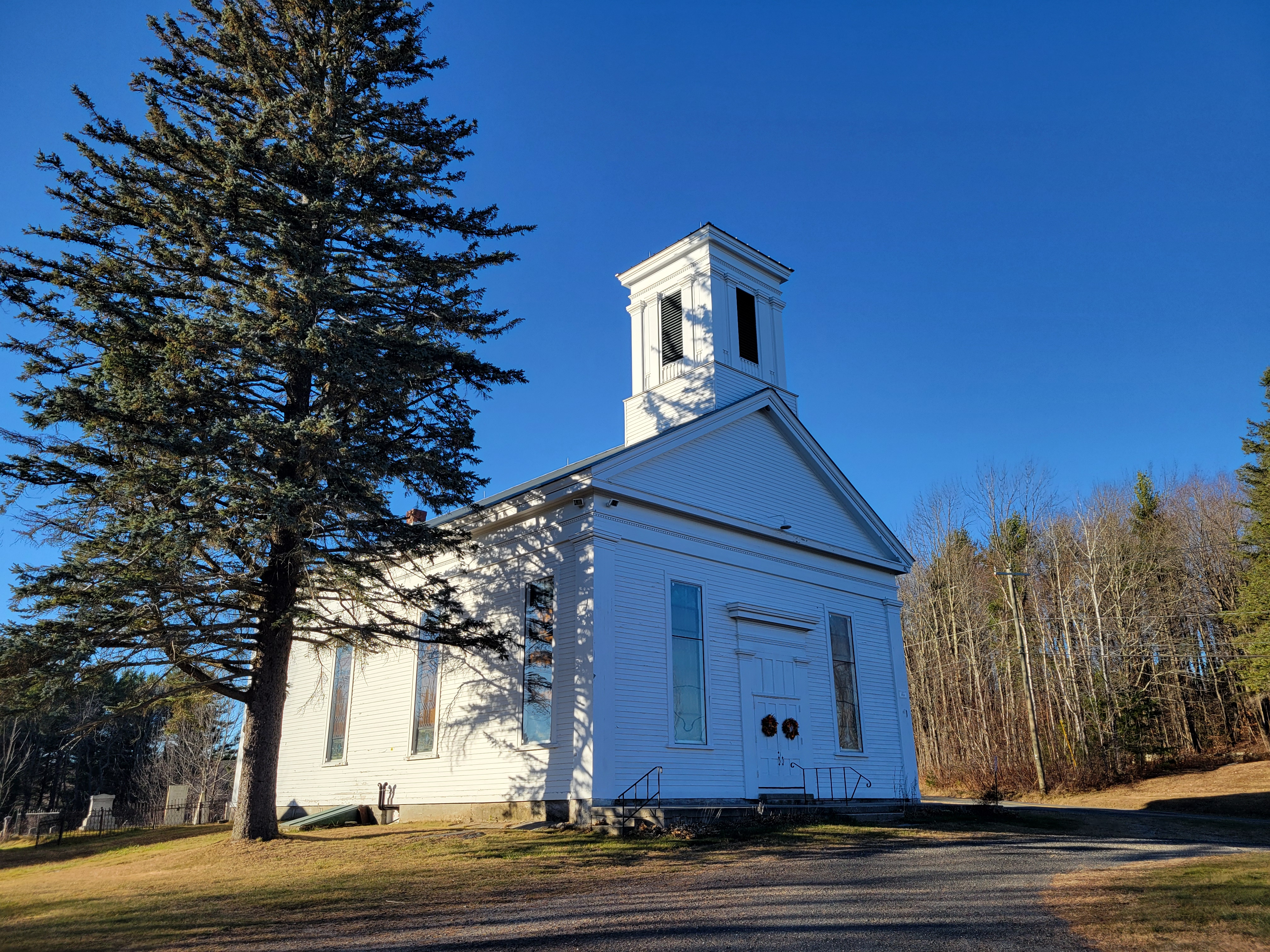
- First Congregational Church

- Location within Massachusetts Location within the United States
- Location: Hamilton and YMCA Rds, MA 8, Becket, Massachusetts
- Coordinates: 42°17′3″N 73°4′8″W
- Architect: Multiple
- Architectural style: Greek Revival, Federal
- NRHP reference No.: 82004952
- Added to NRHP: August 11, 1982

Becket Center Historic District is a historic district encompassing the historic early center of Becket, Massachusetts. Centered at the junction of Massachusetts Route 8 and YMCA Road, this area was the town's civic heart and a center of industry until it was eclipsed in importance by North Becket, which was served by the railroad. Most of the architecture in the district is in the Federal and Greek Revival styles popular in the late 18th to mid 19th centuries. The district was added to the National Register of Historic Places in 1982.

== Description and history ==
Becket was first laid out by colonial settlers in the 1737, but was not settled until the 1750s, and was incorporated as a town in 1765. Its earliest civic structures include the Center Cemetery (1756) on the south side of YMCA Road, militia training and parade ground (at the junction of MA 8 and YMCA Road), the first meetinghouse (1762–64), now demolished, with the site marked north of the parade ground, and a stone animal pound (1768) on the west side of MA 8 that is the finest surviving pound in Berkshire County. The present Greek Revival First Congregational Church was built in 1850, across YMCA Road from the old meetinghouse, but the latter's 19th-century horse sheds were retained. The village's decline began after the 1841 construction of the Western Railroad bypassed it in favor of North Becket. As a result, the village retains a significant number of Federal and Greek Revival buildings, with relatively little subsequent development.

The historic district is geographically centered on YMCA Road, an east-west route joining Route 8 to Hamilton Road. The district extends along the latter two roads south from their junctions with YMCA Road, and a short way north on Hamilton Road. In addition to houses and the buildings already mentioned, the district includes an old post office, old town hall, and a former schoolhouse that has been converted to a residence.

== See also ==
- National Register of Historic Places listings in Berkshire County, Massachusetts
