= Betty Bolognani =

American politician

Member of the Vermont House of Representatives from the Bennington 2-2 district
- In office August 2001 – January 8, 2003
- Appointed by: Howard Dean
- Preceded by: Neil Hoag
- Succeeded by: Philip E. Bartlett

Personal details
- Born: Betty Mae Whitney; February 23, 1926 Stamford, Vermont, U.S.
- Died: November 1, 2016 (aged 90) Readsboro, Vermont, U.S.
- Party: Democratic
- Spouse: James Amedeo Bolognani (m. 1950; died 1989)
- Education: University of Vermont (BS)

Betty Mae Bolognani (February 23, 1926 – November 1, 2016) is an American politician who served in the Vermont House of Representatives from 2001 to 2003. Four months after incumbent representative Neil Hoag resigned due to medical issues, Governor Howard Dean appointed Bolognani to serve out the remainder of his term. A member of the Democratic Party, Bolognani ran in 2002 and 2004 to represent the Windham-Bennington 1 district in the House but lost both times to Republican Philip Bartlett.

== Electoral history ==
Date	Election	Candidate	Party	Votes	%
Vermont House of Representatives, Windham-Bennington 1 district
Nov 5, 2002	General	Philip E. Bartlett	Republican	711	53.38
Nov 5, 2002	General	Betty M. Bolognani	Democratic	616	46.25
Nov 5, 2002	General	Write-Ins		5	0.37
Nov 5, 2002	General	District redrawn; seat flipped from Democratic to Republican			
Nov 2, 2004	General	Philip E. Bartlett	Republican	1,021	50.67
Nov 2, 2004	General	Betty M. Bolognani	Democratic	992	49.23
Nov 2, 2004	General	Write-Ins		2	0.10

Vermont House of Representatives
Preceded by Neil Hoag	Vermont Representative from the Bennington 2-2 District; 2001–2003	Succeeded by Mary A. Morrissey; Albert Krawczyk
