= Bolognani =

Bolognani is a surname. Notable people with the surname include:

- Alessio Bolognani (born 1983), Italian ski jumper
- Betty Bolognani (1926–2016), American politician
