= Vermont Route 8 =

State highway in Bennington County, Vermont, US

Vermont Route 8
- VT 8 highlighted in red

Route information
- Maintained by VTrans
- Length: 13.155 mi (21.171 km)

Major junctions
- South end: VT 100 / Route 8 at the Massachusetts state line in Stamford
- VT 100 in Readsboro
- North end: VT 9 in Searsburg

Location
- Country: United States
- State: Vermont
- Counties: Bennington

Highway system
- State highways in Vermont
← VT 7A	→ VT 8A

Route 8 (VT 8) is a state highway within Vermont. The highway runs 13.2 miles (21.2 km) from the Massachusetts state line in Stamford, where it continues south as Massachusetts Route 8, to VT 9 in Searsburg. VT 8 connects the southeastern Bennington County towns of Stamford, Readsboro, and Searsburg.

== Route description ==
VT 8 begins at the Massachusetts state line in the town of Stamford. The highway continues south as Route 8 toward North Adams. The state line is also the southern terminus of VT 100; the two routes head north along two-lane Main Road parallel to the North Branch of the Hoosic River through the town center of Stamford. VT 8 and VT 100 enter the town of Readsboro just before reaching the source of the river. The highways curve east to the headwaters of the West Branch of the Deerfield River at Heartwellville. There, VT 100 continues southeast along that river. VT 8 turns north along an unnamed tributary of the river, which the highway follows to its source at the Readsboro–Searsburg town line. The highway continues north to the town center of Searsburg, where it reaches its northern terminus at VT 9 (Molly Stark Highway) between Bennington to the west and Brattleboro to the east.

== History ==

Much of Route 8 follows the course of the 1920s era New England Interstate Route 8, a part of the New England road marking system that ran from Bridgeport, Connecticut, through Pittsfield, Massachusetts, to Wilmington, Vermont.

VT 8 was formerly aligned along what is now VT 100 and VT 155 from the Massachusetts state line to VT 103 in Wallingford.

== Major intersections ==
The entire route is in Bennington County.

Location	mi	km	Destinations	Notes
Stamford	0.000	0.000	Route 8 south – North Adams VT 100 begins	Continuation into Massachusetts; southern terminus of VT 100
Readsboro	7.945	12.786	VT 100 north – Jacksonville, Readsboro	Northern end of VT 100 concurrency
Searsburg	13.155	21.171	VT 9 – Bennington, Wilmington, Brattleboro	Northern terminus
1.000 mi = 1.609 km; 1.000 km = 0.621 mi: Concurrency terminus
