= North Becket Village Historic District =

Historic district in Massachusetts, United States

- U.S. National Register of Historic Places
- U.S. Historic district
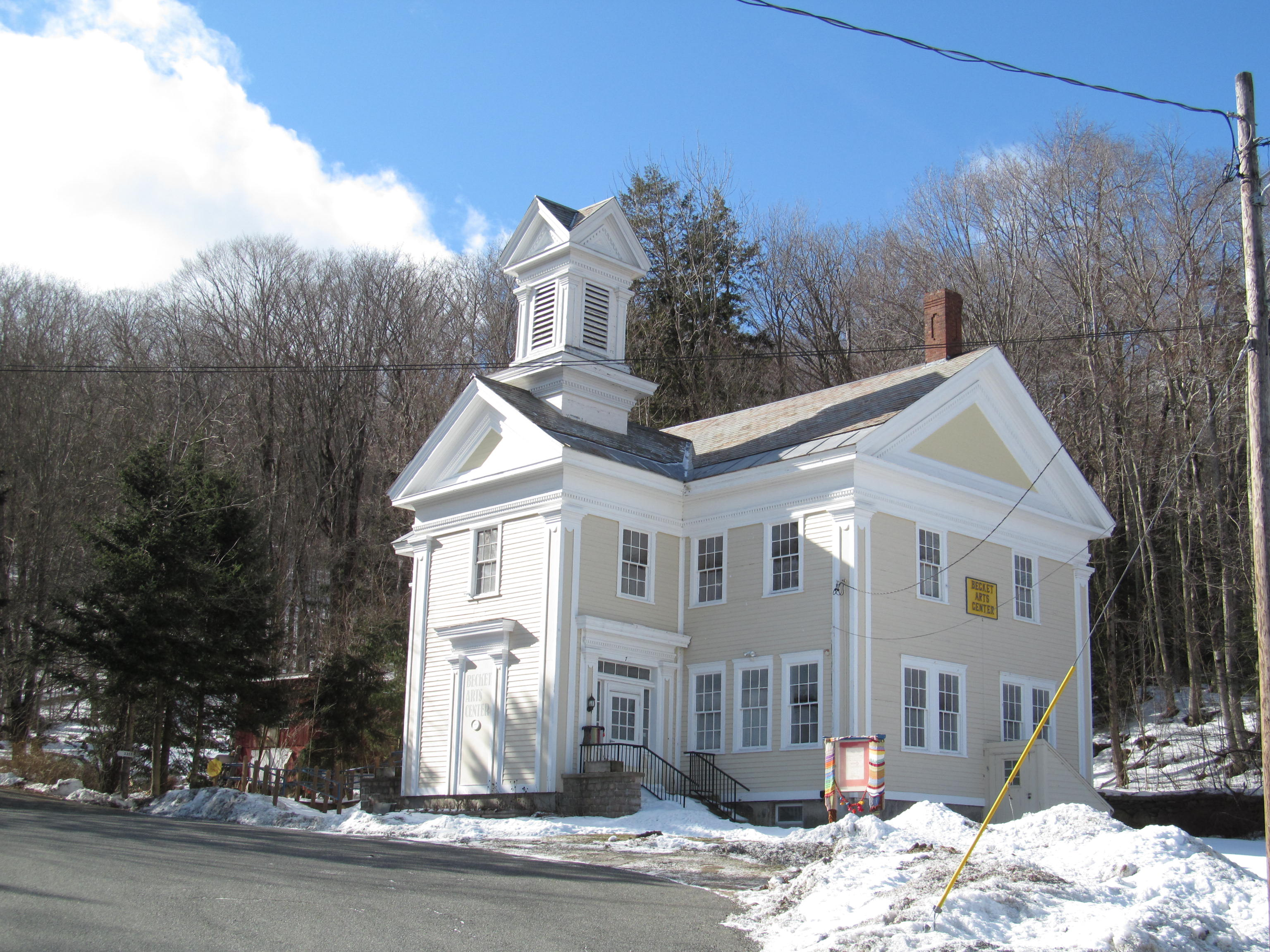
- The Becket Arts Center

- Location within Massachusetts Location within the United States
- Location: Main and High Streets, Becket, Massachusetts
- Coordinates: 42°19′57″N 73°4′58″W
- Built: 1841
- Architectural style: Colonial Revival, Bungalow/Craftsman, Greek Revival
- NRHP reference No.: 88000229
- Added to NRHP: July 26, 1988

North Becket Village Historic District is a historic district encompassing the historic village of North Becket in the Berkshire hill town of Becket, Massachusetts. The village developed rapidly as the main economic and civic center of the town in a 20-year period beginning in 1841 with the arrival of the Western Railroad, and retains many fine examples of Greek Revival architecture. It was listed on the National Register of Historic Places in 1988.

== Description and history ==
The town of Becket was laid out by colonists in the 1730s, but was not settled until the 1750s. It was incorporated as a town in 1765, with its town center located at what is now known as Becket Center, at Massachusetts Route 8 and YMCA Road. North Becket Village did not begin growth until the 1820s, when a sawmill was established. Then in 1841 the Western Railroad was completed along the West Branch Westfield River, and North Becket developed rapidly as an economic center. The brooks feeding the Westfield River became a source of water power for a variety of industries, which distributed their goods to market via the railroad. Over a twenty-year period, many of the towns public institutions moved to the village, and a cluster of Greek Revival residences were built on the west side of Main and High Streets. Most of the village's industries and commercial buildings were wiped out by a flood caused by the breach of a dam on Yokum Brook in 1927, in many cases leaving only foundational remnants.

The historic district extends along Main and High Streets, from Pleasant Street in the north to a point south of the junction of South Washington State Road and Main Street. It covers about 40 acres (16 ha), and has 35 historically significant buildings. Most of these are residences, 1-1/2 to 2-1/2 stories in height, of wood frame construction, and Greek Revival in style. Only two commercial buildings survived the 1927 flood. Prominent public buildings include the Baptist Meetinghouse (1844) and Second Congregational Church (1850), and Seminary Hall (1855), probably the village's most architecturally elaborate building.

== See also ==
- National Register of Historic Places listings in Berkshire County, Massachusetts
