= Throope Chapman =

American revolutionary war soldier

Personal details
- Born: March 25, 1739 Ashford, Connecticut, British American
- Died: 1794 (aged 54–55) Readsboro, Vermont, USA
- Spouse: Deborah Wilson

Throope Chapman (1738–1794) was one of the founders of Readsboro, Vermont, USA. He was an early settler of Dwight, Massachusetts. Throope (also spelled Throop) served with Thomas Knowlton as a member of Captain John Slapp's 8th Co, First Connecticut Regiment, during the Campaign of 1757 in the French and Indian War.

In about 1770, he purchased acreage southwest of the intersection of North Street and Gulf Road, near the Scarborough Brook, where it crosses Gulf Road. Here, three generations of his descendants farmed, had an apiary, and operated a gristmill, wheelwright and carpentry shop.

In 1777, Throope enlisted at Belchertown as a private in Capt. Jonathan Bardwell's company, Col. Elisha Porter's regiment. His sons William and Ebenezer served as well. They founded the village of Belcher, Hebron, Washington County, New York, in 1781.

In 1785, Throope founded Readsboro, Vermont, where he was a selectman until his death in 1794.

Notable descendants include Welcome Chapman and Oliver Smith Chapman.
