= Wayne Winterrowd =

American gardening expert (1941–2010)

Wayne Rudolf Winterrowd (October 29, 1941 – September 17, 2010) was an American gardening expert and designer who wrote extensively on the subject. The garden covering 7 acres (2.8 ha) at his Vermont home became a tourist attraction to visitors from around the world.

== Biography ==
Winterrowd, who was born on October 29, 1941, in Shreveport, Louisiana, started gardening when he was three years old and read widely on the subject while he was growing up. Visits to an aunt who lived near Lake Pontchartrain helped him learn about gardening and he developed an interest in tropical plants on family trips to Florida and Cuba. He attended Louisiana State University, where he completed his bachelor's and master's degrees, and had completed all but the dissertation needed for a doctorate in Jacobean literature. While teaching Jacobean literature at Tufts University in 1969, he first met Joe Eck, and they lived together in Denmark where Winterrowd had earned a Fulbright scholarship.

Together with Eck, Winterrowd learned as much as they could about gardening and earned a living by teaching English, French and Latin at area elementary and high schools. They spent the 1960s and 1970s as part of the homegrown food movement. During the 1980s, Winterrowd wrote lengthy articles for Horticulture, reaching to as many as 3,000 words, in which he intertwined his experiences in gardening with Classic literature and Southern folklore. Moving from a farmhouse in Pepperell, Massachusetts to Readsboro, Vermont, Winterrowd and Eck devoted themselves to create a garden called North Hill, in which they grew Himalayan blue poppies, Japanese dogwoods, locust trees, magnolia, and stewartias. They cleared the hilly wooded land they had acquired, planting a diverse variety of plants, including as many as 100,000 daffodil bulbs. The garden drew visitors from around the world to their home in Southern Vermont near the Massachusetts border. They also grew fresh vegetables and raised dairy cows, pigs and poultry. Roger Swain, host of the Public Broadcasting Service television series The Victory Garden said "Their garden is of such quality and diversity that it rivals any in Europe. But there is nothing derivative about North Hill; it is American gardening at its best", with Fergus Garrett crediting Winterrowd and Eck with being "one of the driving forces in North American horticulture".

Across the United States and Canada, Winterrowd and Eck traveled to design customized gardens for their customers. Their books include A Year at North Hill: Four Seasons in a Vermont Garden in 1995, their 1999 work Living Seasonally: The Kitchen Garden and the Table at North Hill and the 2009 book Our Life in Gardens. They were working on the book To Eat at the time of Winterrowd's death. Winterrowd himself wrote books, including the encyclopedic Annuals and Tender Plants for North American Gardens in 2004.

Winterrowd and Eck were joined in a civil union in 2000 and were married in 2009 after Vermont legalized same-sex marriage. Winterrowd died at age 68 on September 17, 2010, at his home in Readsboro, Vermont due to heart failure. He was survived by Eck and by a son they adopted.
