= Vermont Route 100 =

North-south state highway in Vermont, US

Vermont Route 100
- 43rd Infantry Division Memorial Highway
- Map of Vermont with VT 100 highlighted in red

Route information
- Maintained by VTrans
- Length: 216.666 mi (348.690 km)

Major junctions
- South end: VT 8 / Route 8 at the Massachusetts state line in Stamford
- US 4 near Rutland; VT 15 in Hyde Park; US 2 in Duxbury; I-89 in Waterbury
- North end: VT 105 in Newport

Location
- Country: United States
- State: Vermont
- Counties: Bennington, Windham, Windsor, Rutland, Addison, Washington, Lamoille, Orleans

Highway system
- State highways in Vermont
← I-93	→ VT 101

Vermont Route 100 (VT 100) is a north–south state highway in Vermont in the United States. Running through the center of the state, it travels nearly the entire length of Vermont and is 216.666 miles (349 km) long. VT 100 is the state's longest numbered highway of any type.

== Route description ==
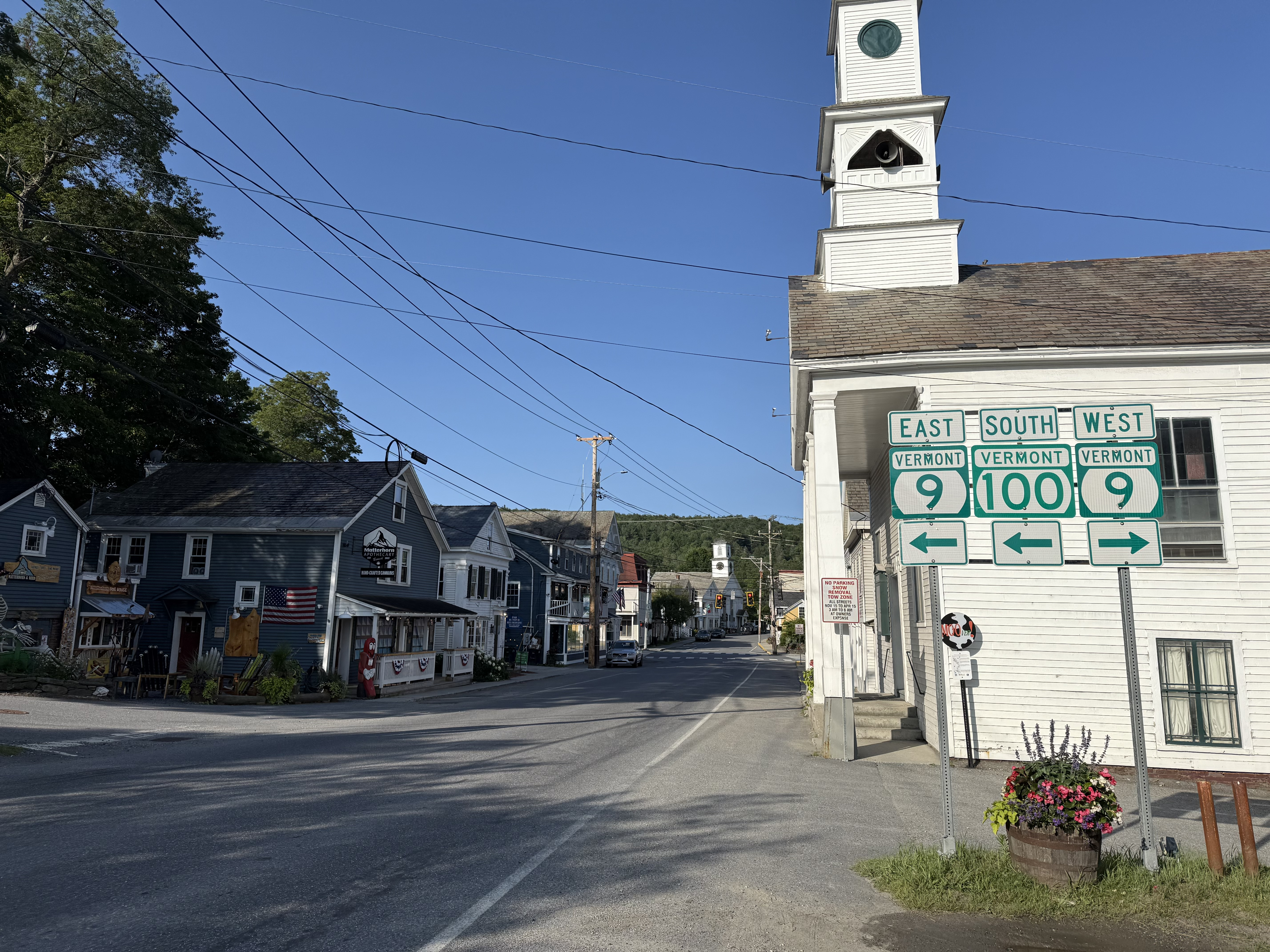
VT 100 southbound approaching VT 9 in Wilmington

The southern terminus of the route is at the Massachusetts state line in Stamford, where it continues south as Route 8. Its northern terminus is at VT 105 in the town of Newport, which lies on the Canadian border. VT 100 passes along the eastern edge of the Green Mountain National Forest for much of its length and also passes through the Mad River Valley. It runs parallel to, and lies between, U.S. Route 7 (US 7) to the west and US 5 to the east.

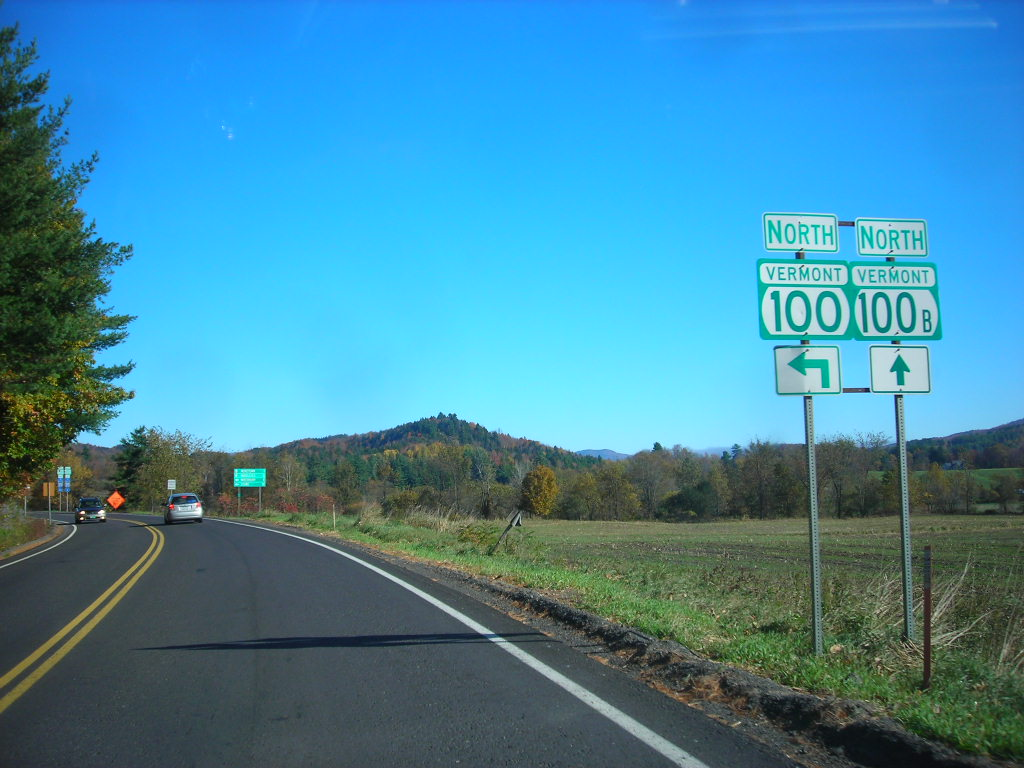
Approaching VT 100B on VT 100 in Moretown

The road is the main thoroughfare for some of Vermont's most well-known resort towns, including Wilmington, Ludlow, Killington, Warren, and Stowe. As such, many of Vermont's ski resorts are located either directly on, or in proximity to, VT 100; these include Okemo Mountain Resort, Mount Snow, Killington, Sugarbush, Mad River Glen, Stowe Mountain Resort and Jay Peak.

VT 100 is a popular tourist route during the fall (for foliage) and winter (for skiing), and can be heavily trafficked during those seasons. Despite this, the road retains a rural feel through most of the towns it traverses and is relatively free of development, except for some of the areas around the ski resorts. The most populous town through which VT 100 passes is Morristown, with a population of just over 5,400.

Several of the most heavily traveled sections of VT 100 (such as the section between Waterbury and Stowe and Warren to Waitsfield) were in very poor condition due to state and local road maintenance budget shortfalls, recent harsh winters and heavy damage by Tropical Storm Irene in 2011; since that storm, the state has undertaken the reconstruction of many segments of the road.

== Major intersections ==
County	Location	mi	km	Destinations	Notes
Bennington	Stamford	0.000	0.000	Route 8 south – North Adams VT 8 begins	Continuation into Massachusetts; southern terminus of VT 8
Bennington	Readsboro	7.945	12.786	VT 8 north – Searsburg	Northern end of VT 8 concurrency
Windham	Jacksonville	21.428	34.485	VT 112 south to VT 8A – Greenfield MA	Northern terminus of VT 112
Windham	Wilmington	26.989	43.435	VT 9 east – Marlboro, Brattleboro	Southern end of VT 9 concurrency
Windham	Wilmington	28.059	45.157	VT 9 west – Searsburg, Bennington	Northern end of VT 9 concurrency
Windham	Jamaica	50.742	81.661	VT 30 south – Townshend, Brattleboro	Southern end of VT 30 concurrency
Windham	Jamaica	58.878	94.755	VT 30 north – Bondville, Manchester	Northern end of VT 30 concurrency
Windham	Londonderry	65.655	105.661	VT 11 west – Bromley Mountain Ski Area, Manchester	Southern end of VT 11 concurrency
Windham	Londonderry	66.069	106.328	VT 11 east – Chester, Springfield	Northern end of VT 11 concurrency
Windsor	Weston	74.455	119.824	VT 155 north – East Wallingford	Southern terminus of VT 155
Windsor	Village of Ludlow	81.548	131.239	VT 103 south – Chester	Southern end of VT 103 concurrency
Windsor	Town of Ludlow	83.382	134.190	VT 103 north – East Wallingford, Rutland	Northern end of VT 103 concurrency
Windsor	Plymouth	92.112	148.240	VT 100A north – Plymouth, Bridgewater Corners	Southern terminus of VT 100A
Windsor	Bridgewater	97.505	156.919	US 4 east – Woodstock, White River Junction	Southern end of US 4 concurrency
Rutland	Killington	103.942	167.278	US 4 west – Pico Ski Area, Rutland	Northern end of US 4 concurrency
Windsor	Stockbridge	114.655	184.519	VT 107 east – Bethel	Western terminus of VT 107
Windsor	Rochester	122.354	196.910	VT 73 west – Goshen, Brandon	Eastern terminus of VT 73
Addison	Hancock	127.432	205.082	VT 125 west – Ripton, East Middlebury	Eastern terminus of VT 125
Washington	Waitsfield	147.370	237.169	VT 17 west – Mount Ellen Ski Area, Mad River Glen Ski Area	Eastern terminus of VT 17
Washington	Moretown	152.821	245.942	VT 100B north to I-89 south – Moretown, Middlesex	Southern terminus of VT 100B
Washington	Moretown	159.827	257.217	US 2 east – Middlesex, Montpelier	Southern end of US 2 concurrency
Washington	Waterbury	161.142	259.333	US 2 west – Bolton, Richmond	Northern end of US 2 concurrency
Washington	Waterbury	161.299– 161.660	259.586– 260.167	I-89 – Middlesex, Montpelier, Richmond, Burlington	Exit 10 on I-89
Lamoille	Stowe	171.212	275.539	VT 108 north – Jeffersonville, Stowe Ski Area	Southern terminus of VT 108
Lamoille	Morrisville	180.063	289.783	VT 15A east to VT 12 – Lake Elmore, Montpelier, Hardwick	Western terminus of VT 15A
Lamoille	Morristown	181.305	291.782	VT 15 east – Wolcott, Hardwick	Roundabout; southern end of VT 15 concurrency
Lamoille	Village of Hyde Park	183.236	294.890	VT 15 west – Johnson, Jeffersonville	Roundabout; northern end of VT 15 concurrency
Lamoille	Town of Hyde Park	188.374	303.159	VT 100C south – East Johnson	Northern terminus of VT 100C
Lamoille	Eden	192.652	310.043	VT 118 north – Belvidere Corners, Montgomery Center	Southern terminus of VT 118
Orleans	Lowell	201.826	324.807	VT 58 west / VT 58 east – Montgomery Center, Irasburg	
Orleans	Troy	209.797	337.636	VT 101 north – Jay, North Troy	Southern terminus of VT 101
Orleans	Town of Newport	215.828	347.341	VT 14 south to US 5 – Coventry, Hardwick	Northern terminus of VT 14
Orleans	Town of Newport	216.666	348.690	VT 105 – Newport, Derby Center, Newport Center, North Troy	Northern terminus
1.000 mi = 1.609 km; 1.000 km = 0.621 mi: Concurrency terminus

== Suffixed routes ==
=== VT 100A ===
Vermont Route 100A
- Location: Plymouth–Bridgewater
- Length: 6.971 mi (11.219 km)

Vermont Route 100A (VT 100A) is a short auxiliary route of VT 100 in Bridgewater. It is about seven miles (11 km) long and connects VT 100 to U.S. Route 4. The route generally runs in a northeast–southwest direction.

=== VT 100B ===
Vermont Route 100B
- Location: Moretown–Middlesex
- Length: 7.922 mi (12.749 km)

Vermont Route 100B (VT 100B) is a spur route that branches off of VT 100 in Moretown. The designation is about eight miles (13 km) long. The route, which runs in a northeast–southwest direction, connects VT 100 to U.S. Route 2 in Middlesex.

=== VT 100C ===
Vermont Route 100C
- Location: Johnson–Hyde Park
- Length: 4.595 mi (7.395 km)

Vermont Route 100C (VT 100C) is a spur route of VT 100 that begins in Hyde Park and runs southwest to an intersection with VT 15 in Johnson. It is about 4.6 miles (7.4 km) long.
