= Neil Hoag =

American politician (born 1941)

Member of the Vermont House of Representatives from the Bennington 2-2 district
- In office January 8, 1997 – April 2001
- Preceded by: Dan Kane
- Succeeded by: Betty Bolognani

Personal details
- Born: Neil Milo Hoag; May 13, 1941 (age 85) Bennington, Vermont, U.S.
- Party: Democratic
- Spouse: Donna Lee Davis (m. 1962)

Neil Milo Hoag (born May 13, 1941) is an American Democratic Party politician who served in the Vermont House of Representatives from January 8, 1997, until his resignation for medical reasons in April 2001.

Vermont House of Representatives
Preceded by Dan Kane	Vermont Representative from the Bennington 2-2 District; 1997–2001	Succeeded by Betty Bolognani
