= Bennington County, Vermont =

County in Vermont, United States

- County
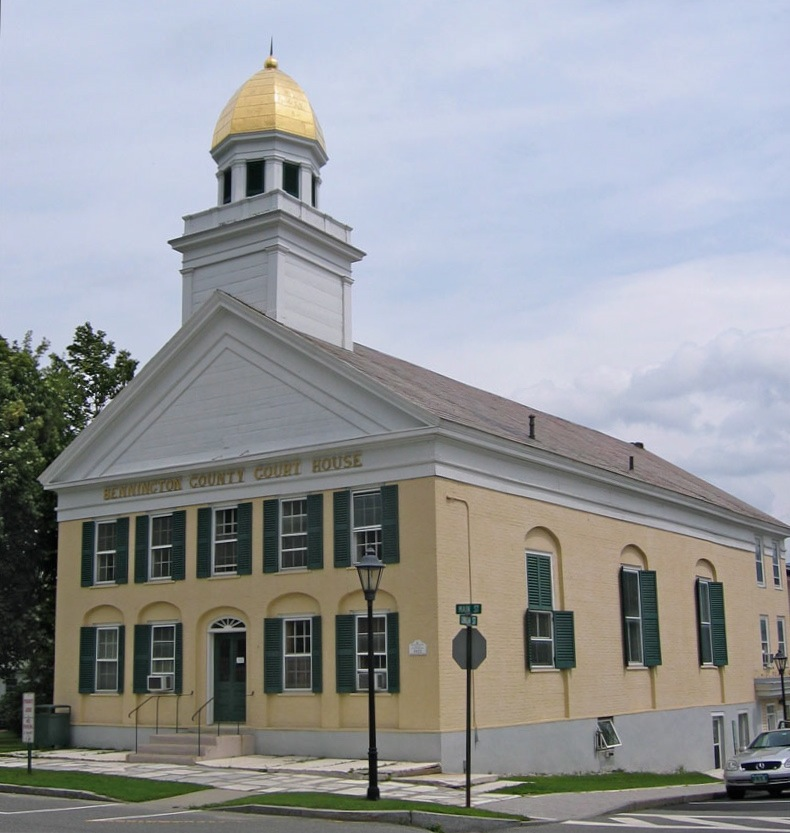
- Bennington County courthouse in Manchester

- Location within the U.S. state of Vermont
- Coordinates: 43°01′46″N 73°06′29″W
- Country: United States
- State: Vermont
- Founded: 1778
- Named for: Benning Wentworth
- Shire Town: Bennington & Manchester
- Largest town: Bennington

Area
  - Total: 678 sq mi (1,760 km^{2})
  - Land: 675 sq mi (1,750 km^{2})
  - Water: 2.7 sq mi (7.0 km^{2}) 0.4%

Population (2020)
  - Total: 37,347
  - Estimate (2025): 36,630 ▼
  - Density: 55.3/sq mi (21.4/km^{2})
- Time zone: UTC−5 (Eastern)
  - Summer (DST): UTC−4 (EDT)
- Congressional district: At-large
- Website: https://benningtonvt.org/

Bennington County is a county in the U.S. state of Vermont. As of the 2020 census, the population was 37,347. The shire towns (county seats) are jointly Bennington ("The Southshire") and Manchester ("The Northshire"), and the largest municipality is Bennington. Bennington is the only county in Vermont with two shire towns. Thus, it is the only county in the United States to have two "shire towns" within its boundaries (as every US state except for Vermont refers to their seats of government as county/parish/borough seats). The county was created in 1778.

== History ==
Bennington is the oldest county in Vermont still in existence, created by the first general assembly on March 17, 1778. Vermont was organized into two original counties, with Bennington in the west and Unity (a few days later renamed Cumberland) in the east. On February 16, 1781, Rutland County was created from Bennington County. On April 13, 1781, Bennington gained the gore east of the town of Bromley (now Peru) from Windham and Windsor Counties, now known as Landgrove.

From June 26, 1781, until February 23, 1782, Vermont attempted to annex part of New York east of the Hudson River (the so-called West Union); inhabitants in the area favored Vermont's township form of government, while Vermont hoped to gain bargaining power through expansion. New York did not lose control of the area. For almost seven months Bennington County overlapped part of Albany County, New York.

On February 27, 1787, Windham County gained the town of Stratton from Bennington County, On October 25, 1805, Rutland County gained territory from Bennington County when Mount Tabor acquired land from Peru. The county gained from Rutland County when the town of Dorset gained a small area from the town of Mount Tabor on November 17, 1825.

== Geography ==
According to the U.S. Census Bureau, the county has a total area of 678 square miles (1,760 km^{2}), of which 675 square miles (1,750 km^{2}) is land and 2.7 square miles (7.0 km^{2}) (0.4%) is water.

=== Adjacent counties ===
- Rutland County – north
- Windsor County – northeast
- Windham County – east
- Franklin County, Massachusetts – southeast
- Berkshire County, Massachusetts – south
- Rensselaer County, New York – southwest
- Washington County, New York – northwest

=== National protected areas ===
- Green Mountain National Forest (part)
- White Rocks National Recreation Area (part)

== Demographics ==
Historical population
Census	Pop.	Note	%±
1790	12,206		—
1800	14,617		19.8%
1810	15,893		8.7%
1820	16,125		1.5%
1830	17,468		8.3%
1840	16,872		−3.4%
1850	18,589		10.2%
1860	19,436		4.6%
1870	21,325		9.7%
1880	21,950		2.9%
1890	20,448		−6.8%
1900	21,705		6.1%
1910	21,378		−1.5%
1920	21,577		0.9%
1930	21,655		0.4%
1940	22,286		2.9%
1950	24,115		8.2%
1960	25,088		4.0%
1970	29,282		16.7%
1980	33,345		13.9%
1990	35,845		7.5%
2000	36,994		3.2%
2010	37,125		0.4%
2020	37,347		0.6%
2025 (est.)	36,630	▼	−1.9%
U.S. Decennial Census; 1790–1960 1900–1990; 1990–2000 2010–2018

=== 2020 census ===
As of the 2020 census, the county had a population of 37,347. Of the residents, 19.2% were under the age of 18 and 24.2% were 65 years of age or older; the median age was 47.9 years. For every 100 females there were 95.6 males, and for every 100 females age 18 and over there were 92.2 males.

The racial makeup of the county was 91.5% White, 1.2% Black or African American, 0.2% American Indian and Alaska Native, 1.1% Asian, 0.9% from some other race, and 5.2% from two or more races. Hispanic or Latino residents of any race comprised 2.5% of the population.

There were 15,699 households in the county, of which 24.7% had children under the age of 18 living with them and 27.2% had a female householder with no spouse or partner present. About 31.0% of all households were made up of individuals and 15.2% had someone living alone who was 65 years of age or older.

There were 20,815 housing units, of which 24.6% were vacant. Among occupied housing units, 72.1% were owner-occupied and 27.9% were renter-occupied. The homeowner vacancy rate was 1.8% and the rental vacancy rate was 8.6%.

Bennington County, Vermont – Racial and ethnic composition Note: the US Census treats Hispanic/Latino as an ethnic category. This table excludes Latinos from the racial categories and assigns them to a separate category. Hispanics/Latinos may be of any race.
Race / Ethnicity (NH = Non-Hispanic)	Pop 2000	Pop 2010	Pop 2020	% 2000	% 2010	% 2020
White alone (NH)	35,916	35,517	33,897	97.08%	95.66%	90.76%
Black or African American alone (NH)	149	291	405	0.40%	0.78%	1.08%
Native American or Alaska Native alone (NH)	69	71	63	0.18%	0.19%	0.16%
Asian alone (NH)	226	264	397	0.61%	0.71%	1.06%
Pacific Islander alone (NH)	4	13	5	0.01%	0.03%	0.01%
Other race alone (NH)	34	20	119	0.09%	0.05%	0.31%
Mixed race or Multiracial (NH)	252	424	1,522	0.68%	1.14%	4.07%
Hispanic or Latino (any race)	344	525	939	0.92%	1.41%	2.51%
Total	36,994	37,125	37,347	100.00%	100.00%	100.00%

=== 2010 census ===
As of the 2010 United States census, there were 37,125 people, 15,470 households, and 9,767 families living in the county. The population density was 55.0 inhabitants per square mile (21.2/km^{2}). There were 20,922 housing units at an average density of 31.0 units per square mile (12.0 units/km^{2}). The racial makeup of the county was 96.6% white, 0.8% black, 0.7% Asian, 0.3% American Indian, 0.3% from other races, and 1.3% from two or more races. Those of Hispanic or Latino origin made up 1.4% of the population. The largest ancestry groups were:

- (Republic of Ireland) 18.8% Irish
- (England) 17.1% English
- (France) 14.8% French
- (Germany) 13.9% German
- (Italy) 9.8% Italian
- (United States) 5.9% American
- (Canada) 5.5% French Canadian
- (Scotland) 4.2% Scottish
- (Poland) 3.9% Polish
- (Northern Ireland) 2.8% Scotch-Irish
- (Netherlands) 2.3% Dutch
- (Sweden) 1.7% Swedish
- (Russia) 1.6% Russian
- (Wales) 1.3% Welsh

Of the 15,470 households, 27.4% had children under the age of 18 living with them, 48.1% were married couples living together, 10.6% had a female householder with no husband present, 36.9% were non-families, and 29.9% of all households were made up of individuals. The average household size was 2.30 and the average family size was 2.83. The median age was 45.1 years.

The median income for a household in the county was $47,396 and the median income for a family was $60,642. Males had a median income of $40,996 versus $32,068 for females. The per capita income for the county was $27,962. About 8.6% of families and 10.9% of the population were below the poverty line, including 18.1% of those under age 18 and 5.9% of those age 65 or over.

=== 2000 census ===
As of the census of 2000, there were 36,994 people, 14,846 households, and 9,917 families living in the county. The population density was 55 people per square mile (21 people/km^{2}). There were 19,403 housing units at an average density of 29 units per square mile (11 units/km^{2}). The racial makeup of the county was 97.75% White, 0.42% Black or African American, 0.20% Native American, 0.62% Asian, 0.01% Pacific Islander, 0.21% from other races, and 0.80% from two or more races. 0.93% of the population were Hispanic or Latino of any race. 16.5% were of Irish, 16.0% English, 10.5% French, 9.1% German, 9.0% American, 8.1% Italian and 6.3% French Canadian ancestry. 96.4% spoke English, 1.2% Spanish and 1.2% French as their first language.

There were 14,846 households, out of which 30.50% had children under the age of 18 living with them, 53.10% were married couples living together, 10.10% had a female householder with no husband present, and 33.20% were non-families. 26.80% of all households were made up of individuals, and 11.60% had someone living alone who was 65 years of age or older. The average household size was 2.41 and the average family size was 2.91.

In the county, the population was spread out, with 23.70% under the age of 18, 7.70% from 18 to 24, 26.30% from 25 to 44, 25.70% from 45 to 64, and 16.70% who were 65 years of age or older. The median age was 40 years. For every 100 females there were 92.20 males. For every 100 females age 18 and over, there were 87.90 males.

The median income for a household in the county was $39,926, and the median income for a family was $46,565. Males had a median income of $31,982 versus $23,632 for females. The per capita income for the county was $21,193. About 7.00% of families and 10.00% of the population were below the poverty line, including 13.40% of those under age 18 and 7.90% of those age 65 or over.

== Politics ==
In 1828, Bennington County voted for National Republican Party candidate John Quincy Adams and for Henry Clay in 1832.

From William Henry Harrison in 1836 to Winfield Scott in 1852, the county would vote for the Whig Party's candidates.

From John C. Frémont in 1856 to Richard Nixon in 1960, the Republican Party would have a 104-year winning streak in the county.

In 1964, the county was won by Democratic Party incumbent President Lyndon B. Johnson, who became not only the first Democratic presidential candidate to win the county, but to win the state of Vermont entirely.

Following the Democrats' victory in 1964, the county went back to voting for Republican candidates for another 20 year winning streak starting with Richard Nixon in 1968 and ending with George H. W. Bush in 1988, who became the last Republican presidential candidate to win the county.

In 1992, the county was won by Bill Clinton; it has been won by Democratic candidates ever since.

The county has voted for the statewide winner in 47 consecutive elections, tied with neighboring Rutland County, Vermont for the longest such streak in the nation.

United States presidential election results for Bennington County, Vermont
Year	Republican		Democratic		Third party(ies)	
Year	No.	%	No.	%	No.	%
1856	2,120	71.26%	785	26.39%	70	2.35%
1860	1,937	70.54%	710	25.86%	99	3.61%
1864	2,327	69.44%	1,021	30.47%	3	0.09%
1868	2,592	74.55%	885	25.45%	0	0.00%
1872	2,471	72.19%	864	25.24%	88	2.57%
1876	2,426	58.40%	1,728	41.60%	0	0.00%
1880	2,641	64.71%	1,440	35.29%	0	0.00%
1884	2,335	62.58%	1,366	36.61%	30	0.80%
1888	2,497	60.72%	1,128	27.43%	487	11.84%
1892	2,196	64.21%	1,155	33.77%	69	2.02%
1896	3,086	80.39%	656	17.09%	97	2.53%
1900	2,666	74.57%	871	24.36%	38	1.06%
1904	2,419	74.29%	745	22.88%	92	2.83%
1908	2,453	73.66%	748	22.46%	129	3.87%
1912	1,464	36.10%	1,057	26.07%	1,534	37.83%
1916	2,602	60.40%	1,590	36.91%	116	2.69%
1920	4,172	71.43%	1,615	27.65%	54	0.92%
1924	5,341	72.91%	1,466	20.01%	518	7.07%
1928	6,114	63.49%	3,498	36.32%	18	0.19%
1932	5,250	55.76%	3,964	42.10%	202	2.15%
1936	5,515	56.08%	4,166	42.36%	153	1.56%
1940	5,845	57.42%	4,308	42.32%	27	0.27%
1944	5,252	58.61%	3,709	41.39%	0	0.00%
1948	5,840	62.30%	3,340	35.63%	194	2.07%
1952	8,385	73.31%	3,018	26.39%	34	0.30%
1956	8,434	75.59%	2,719	24.37%	4	0.04%
1960	7,099	61.19%	4,502	38.80%	1	0.01%
1964	3,895	34.61%	7,359	65.39%	0	0.00%
1968	5,967	52.27%	4,966	43.50%	483	4.23%
1972	7,542	60.56%	4,804	38.58%	107	0.86%
1976	6,712	54.19%	5,443	43.94%	232	1.87%
1980	6,091	44.39%	5,361	39.07%	2,269	16.54%
1984	9,035	59.11%	6,039	39.51%	210	1.37%
1988	8,387	53.34%	7,174	45.62%	164	1.04%
1992	5,895	32.36%	8,178	44.89%	4,143	22.74%
1996	5,229	32.37%	8,139	50.39%	2,784	17.24%
2000	7,284	41.21%	9,021	51.03%	1,372	7.76%
2004	7,616	39.95%	11,069	58.06%	380	1.99%
2008	6,133	32.06%	12,524	65.47%	472	2.47%
2012	5,687	32.33%	11,514	65.45%	392	2.23%
2016	5,925	34.09%	9,539	54.88%	1,917	11.03%
2020	7,114	34.77%	12,705	62.09%	643	3.14%
2024	7,697	37.17%	12,326	59.52%	687	3.32%

== Education ==
Bennington is home to Bennington College. The Community College of Vermont and Vermont Technical College also have campuses in downtown Bennington. Southern Vermont College was located in Bennington, but closed in 2019.

Bennington County is home to these high schools:

- Mount Anthony Union High School in Bennington
- Burr & Burton Academy in Manchester
- Arlington Memorial School in Arlington
- Long Trail School in Dorset
- Grace Christian School in Bennington, Vermont

== Law enforcement ==
Bennington County is home to these local law enforcement agencies:

- Bennington Police Department
- Manchester Police Department
- Winhall Police Department

The Bennington County Sheriff's Department and Vermont State Police are two other sources of law enforcement for the county, especially in towns without their own local police departments.

== Transportation ==
=== Major highways ===
- US 7
- VT 7A
- VT 8
- VT 9
- VT 11
- VT 30
- VT 67
- VT 67A
- VT 100
- VT 153
- VT 279
- VT 313
- VT 315
- VT 346

=== Bus ===
The main public transportation provider in Bennington County is the Green Mountain Community Network, whose Green Mountain Express bus system has five local bus routes in and around the town of Bennington and three commuter routes to Manchester; Wilmington; Williamstown, Massachusetts; and points in between as of September 29, 2014. Readsboro is served out of Wilmington by Southeast Vermont Transit's (formerly the Deerfield Valley Transit Association) fare free MOOver bus. There are also commuter buses to Rutland from Manchester and a regional bus line to Albany, New York from Bennington via Marble Valley Regional Transit District and Yankee Trails World Travel, respectively. Premier Coach's Vermont Translines (a partner of Greyhound) also stops in Bennington and Manchester on its intercity bus route between Albany and Burlington. The Shires Connector, an Amtrak Thruway intercity bus route also operated by Vermont Translines, also links Manchester and Bennington with Albany, NY's train station in Rensselaer, New York, their Greyhound bus station and airport.

=== Air ===
William H. Morse State Airport is a small public-use and state-owned airport west of downtown Bennington, serving private aviation interests. Commercial airlines are available at Albany International Airport to the west in the state of New York, and to the north at Rutland Southern Vermont Regional Airport in Rutland County.

== Communities ==
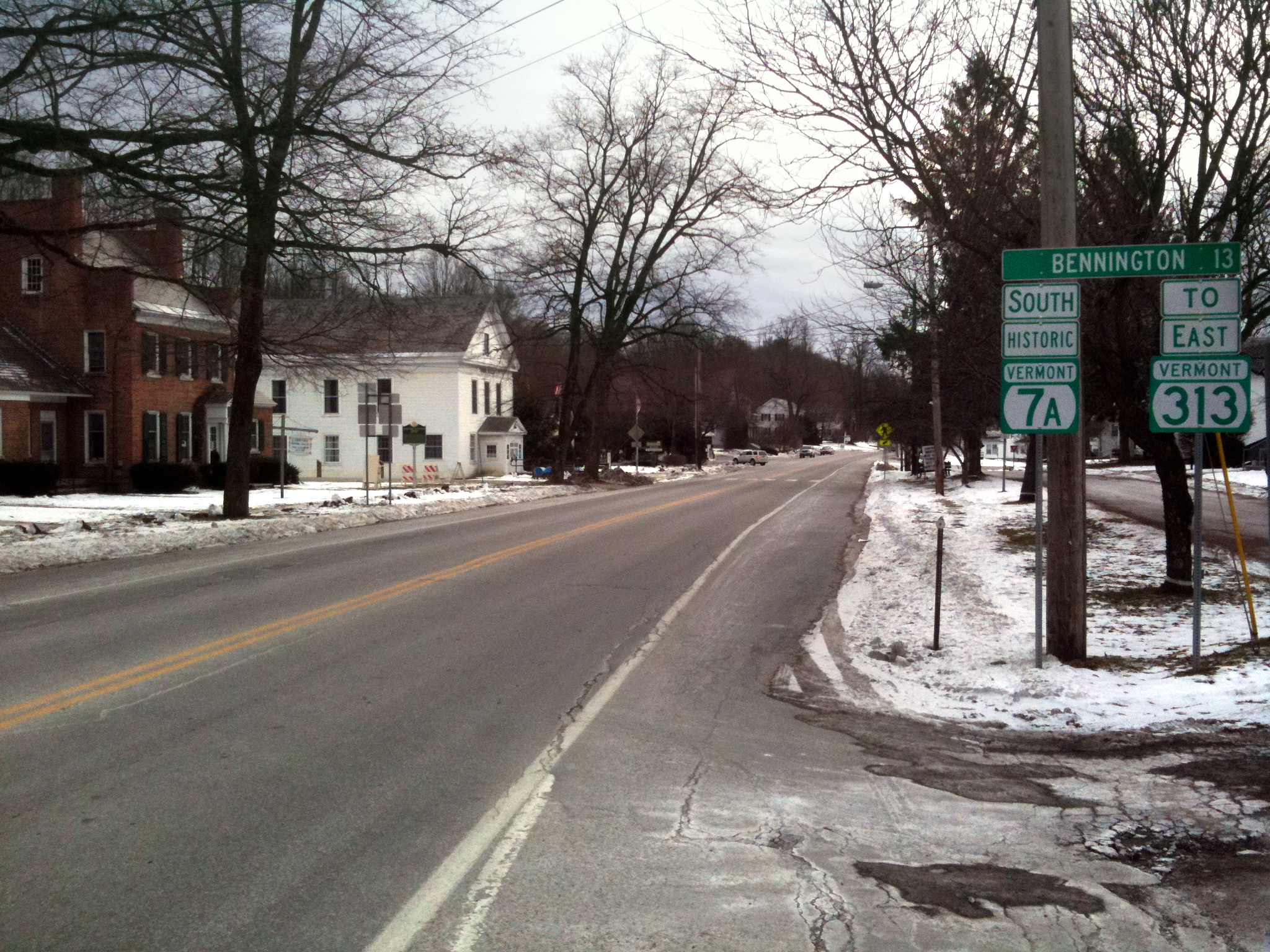
Downtown Arlington

=== Towns ===
- Arlington
- Bennington (shire town)
- Dorset
- Glastenbury
- Landgrove
- Manchester (shire town)
- Peru
- Pownal
- Readsboro
- Rupert
- Sandgate
- Searsburg
- Shaftsbury
- Stamford
- Sunderland
- Winhall
- Woodford

=== Villages ===
- Manchester Village
- North Bennington
- Old Bennington

=== Census-designated places ===
- Arlington
- Bennington
- Dorset
- East Dorset
- Manchester Center
- North Pownal
- Pownal
- Pownal Center
- Readsboro
- South Shaftsbury
- Stamford
- Stratton Mountain (partly in the town of Stratton in Windham County)

=== Other communities ===
- Bondville

== See also ==
- List of counties in Vermont
- List of municipalities in Vermont
- National Register of Historic Places listings in Bennington County, Vermont
