= Readsboro, Vermont =

- Town
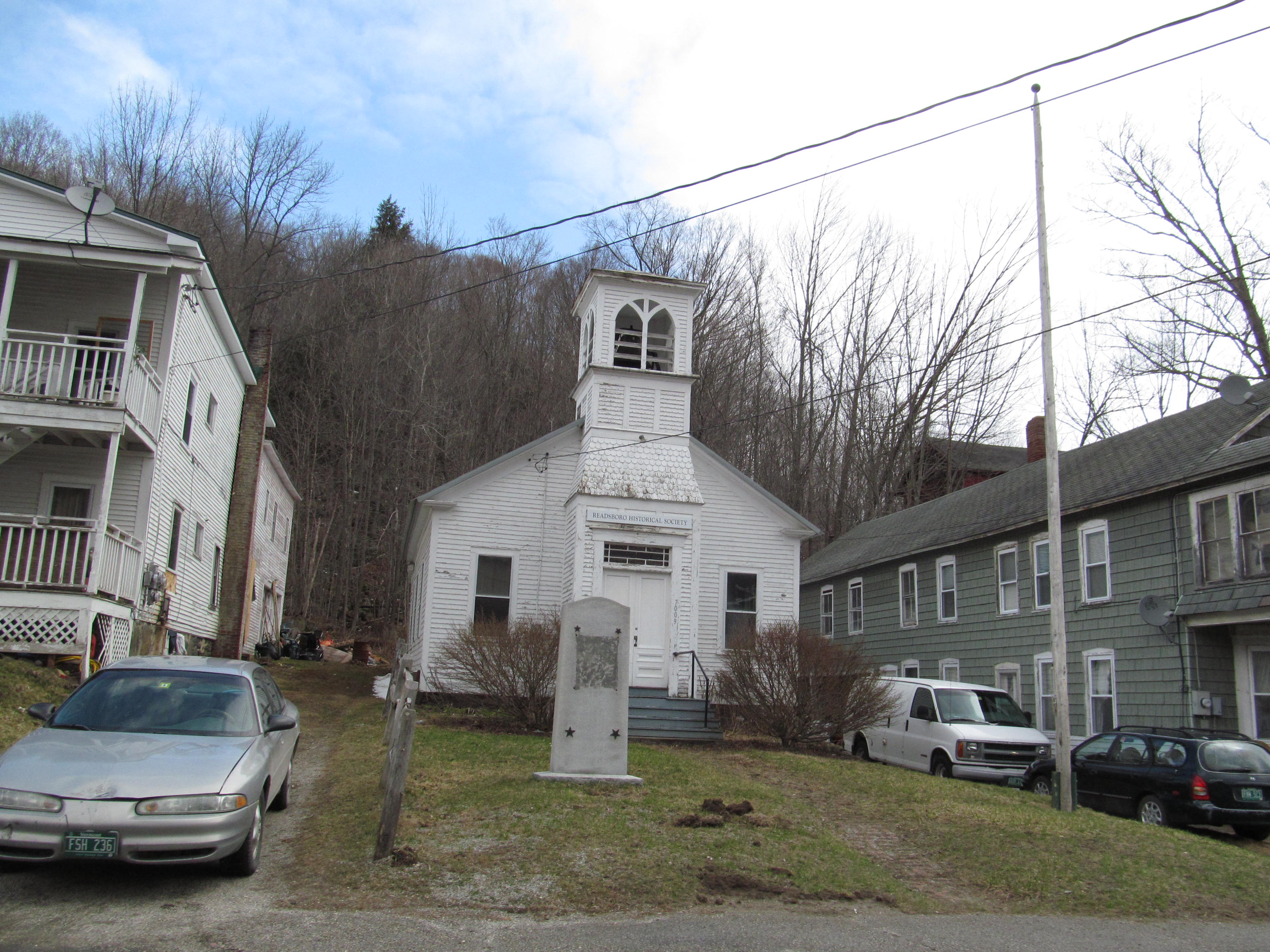
- Readsboro
- Nickname: Reads-bury
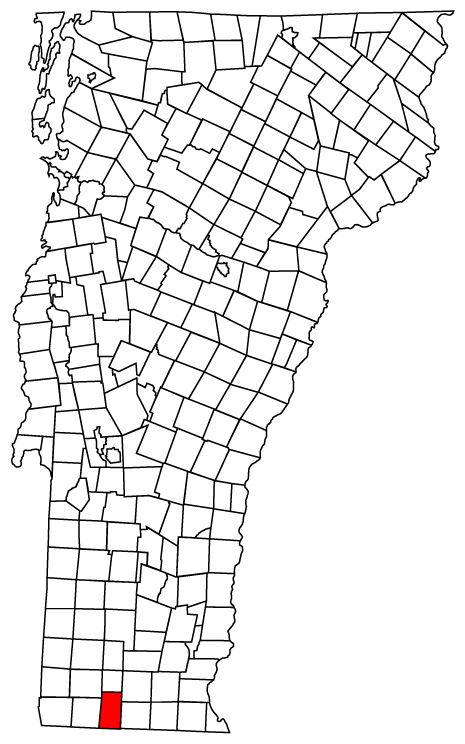
- Readsboro, Vermont
- Coordinates: 42°46′32″N 72°58′50″W
- Country: United States
- State: Vermont
- County: Bennington
- Communities: Readsboro; Heartwellville

Area
  - Total: 36.5 sq mi (94.5 km^{2})
  - Land: 36.3 sq mi (94.1 km^{2})
  - Water: 0.15 sq mi (0.4 km^{2})
- Elevation: 1,641 ft (500 m)

Population (2020)
  - Total: 702
  - Density: 19/sq mi (7.5/km^{2})
- Time zone: UTC−5 (Eastern (EST))
  - Summer (DST): UTC−4 (EDT)
- ZIP Codes: 05350, 05352
- Area code: 802
- FIPS code: 50-58600
- GNIS feature ID: 1462184
- Website: readsborovt.org

Readsboro is a town in Bennington County, Vermont, United States. The town was named after John Reade, a landholder. The population was 702 at the 2020 census. The hamlet of Heartwellville is in the northern part of Readsboro, approximately 5 miles (8 km) north on Route 100 from the hamlet of Readsboro.

The Readsboro census-designated place consists of the town center and had a population of 297 at the 2020 census.

== Geography ==
Readsboro is in the southeast corner of Bennington County, bordered by the town of Monroe in Franklin County, Massachusetts, to the south, and by the towns of Whitingham and Wilmington in Windham County, Vermont, to the east. The Bennington County towns of Searsburg (north), Woodford (northwest), and Stamford (west) also border Readsboro. The main settlement in town, also named Readsboro, is located in the southeast part of the town, along the Deerfield River, a tributary of the Connecticut River.

According to the United States Census Bureau, the town has a total area of 36.5 square miles (94.5 km^{2}), of which 36.3 square miles (94.1 km^{2}) is land and 0.15 square miles (0.4 km^{2}), or 0.41%, is water.

== Transportation ==
Vermont Route 100 passes through Readsboro, including the town center, and leads east to Jacksonville. Vermont Route 8 intersects VT 100 in Heartwellville in the northwestern part of the town and leads north to Vermont Route 9 in Searsburg. VT 8 and VT 100 together lead southwest through Stamford to the Massachusetts state line near North Adams.

Public transportation is provided by Southeast Vermont Transit's fare-free MOOver bus route 9 with buses running twice daily.

== Demographics ==
Historical population
Census	Pop.	Note	%±
1790	64		—
1800	234		265.6%
1810	410		75.2%
1820	530		29.3%
1830	662		24.9%
1840	767		15.9%
1850	857		11.7%
1860	930		8.5%
1870	828		−11.0%
1880	743		−10.3%
1890	910		22.5%
1900	1,139		25.2%
1910	1,252		9.9%
1920	1,173		−6.3%
1930	1,043		−11.1%
1940	913		−12.5%
1950	847		−7.2%
1960	783		−7.6%
1970	638		−18.5%
1980	638		0.0%
1990	762		19.4%
2000	809		6.2%
2010	763		−5.7%
2020	702		−8.0%
U.S. Decennial Census

As of the census of 2000, there were 809 people, 321 households, and 225 families residing in the town. The population density was 22.2 people per square mile (8.6/km^{2}). There were 466 housing units at an average density of 12.8 per square mile (4.9/km^{2}). The racial makeup of the town was 98.76% White, 0.49% Native American, 0.25% Asian, and 0.49% from two or more races. Hispanic or Latino of any race were 1.11% of the population.

There were 321 households, out of which 33.0% had children under the age of 18 living with them, 55.1% were couples living together and joined in either marriage or civil union, 6.9% had a female householder with no husband present, and 29.9% were non-families. Of all households 25.9% were made up of individuals, and 14.6% had someone living alone who was 65 years of age or older. The average household size was 2.44 and the average family size was 2.89.

In the town, the age distribution of the population shows 24.6% under the age of 18, 6.8% from 18 to 24, 26.0% from 25 to 44, 25.5% from 45 to 64, and 17.2% who were 65 years of age or older. The median age was 41 years. For every 100 females, there were 100.7 males. For every 100 females age 18 and over, there were 102.0 males.

The median income for a household in the town was $35,000, and the median income for a family was $48,214. Males had a median income of $33,056 versus $21,964 for females. The per capita income for the town was $17,911. None of the families and 7.0% of the population were living below the poverty line, including no under eighteens and 9.2% of those over 64.

== Notable people ==
- Arthur P. Carpenter, US Marshal for Vermont
- Throope Chapman, one of the Readsboro founders
- Welcome Chapman, early Mormon leader, grandson of Throope Chapman
- Josephine C. Lawney (1881–1962), physician, medical missionary
- Wayne Winterrowd (1941–2010), horticulturist and author
- Nick Zammuto, musician and founding member of The Books

== Books ==
- Gianpaolo Zeni, En Merica! L'emigrazione della gente di Magasa e Valvestino in America, Il Chiese, Storo 2005. OCLC 955060610.
