= Massachusetts Route 8 =

State highway in Berkshire County, Massachusetts

Route 8
- Curran Memorial Highway
- Route 8 highlighted in red

Route information
- Maintained by MassDOT
- Length: 66.643 mi (107.252 km)

Major junctions
- South end: Route 8 at the Connecticut state line near Sandisfield
- US 20 in Becket; Route 9 in Pittsfield; Route 2 in North Adams
- North end: VT 8 / VT 100 at the Vermont state line in Stamford, VT

Location
- Country: United States
- State: Massachusetts
- Counties: Berkshire

Highway system
- Massachusetts State Highway System; Interstate; US; State
← Route 7A	→ Route 8A
← Route 7	N.E.	→ Route 9

Route 8 is the portion of the 148-mile multistate New England Route 8 within the state of Massachusetts. The highway runs 66.643 miles (107.252 km) from the Connecticut state line in Sandisfield, where the highway continues as Connecticut Route 8, north to the Vermont state line in Clarksburg, where the highway continues as Vermont Route 8 and VT 100. Route 8 serves several towns in eastern and northern Berkshire County. The highway is the main highway between the cities of Pittsfield and North Adams, where the route intersects Route 9 and Route 2, respectively. Route 8 also intersects U.S. Route 20 (US 20) in Becket.

== Route description ==
Route 8 begins at the Connecticut state line, from which the highway continues south as Connecticut Route 8, in the southeastern corner of the town of Sandisfield and of Berkshire County. The two-lane highway heads north along the west side of Colebrook River Lake, an impoundment of the West Branch of the Farmington River that follows the Berkshire–Hampden county line. At the north end of the lake, Route 8 crosses over the river and very briefly runs atop the county line. The highway follows Main Street through the village center of New Boston, where it has a very short concurrency with Route 57 in which the routes cross to the west side of the river. Route 8 continues along the river into the town of Otis. In the center of town, the highway briefly runs concurrently with Route 23.

Route 8 crosses the West Branch of the Farmington River a few times as it enters the town of Becket. In the hamlet of West Becket, which lies just south of the river's source, the highway meets US 20 (Jacobs Ladder Road). The U.S. Highway and state highway head east, passing under Interstate 90 (Massachusetts Turnpike) on their way to Bonny Rigg Corners. There, US 20 continues east along Chester Road and Route 8 turns north onto Main Street. Route 8 veers northwest and then north along Yokum Brook to the town center of Becket, where the highway begins to parallel CSX's Berkshire Subdivision rail line and Depot Brook. The highway follows the latter stream to its source in the town of Washington. Route 8 crosses over the railroad and begins to parallel the East Branch of the Housatonic River in the town of Hinsdale, where it meets the western end of Route 143.

Route 8 continues northwest along the river and railroad to the town of Dalton, within which the highway follows Main Street. In the center of town, the route intersects Route 9 and Route 8A (North Street), which has its southern terminus at the intersection and is officially Route 8A(L). Routes 8 and 9 head west and enter the city of Pittsfield along Dalton Avenue. Shortly after entering the city, Route 8 turns north onto Cheshire Road and Route 9 veers southwest onto Merrill Road toward downtown Pittsfield, where the highway ends at US 20 and US 7. Route 8 heads north parallel to the Pittsfield–North Adams rail line into the town of Lanesborough, where the highway parallels the South Branch of the Hoosic River north from its source. The highway follows the east side of Cheshire Reservoir, an impoundment of the river, to the center of the town of Cheshire.

Route 8 continues through the river valley on the east side of Mount Greylock and enters the town of Adams, where it meets the northern end of Route 116. Shortly after entering the city of North Adams, another Route 8A (officially Route 8A(U) splits east along Hodges Cross Road. In downtown North Adams, Route 8 crosses to the east of the South Branch of the Hoosic River, passes under Route 2 (Mohawk Trail) just south of the Massachusetts Museum of Contemporary Art, then curves east and then south along St. Anthony Drive and Holden Street, respectively, to intersect the other route. Routes 2 and 8 head east along a four-lane boulevard to Eagle Street, where the highways meet the northern end of Route 8A. The highways follow two-lane Mohawk Trail east across the North branch of the Hoosic River to Beaver Street, onto which Route 8 turns north. The highway follows the river north through the town of Clarksburg to the Vermont state line, where the road continues as VT 8 and VT 100.

== History ==

Much of Route 8 follows the course of the 1920s era New England Interstate Route 8, a part of the New England road marking system that ran from Bridgeport, Connecticut, through Pittsfield to Wilmington, Vermont.

== Major intersections ==
The entire route is in Berkshire County.

Location	mi	km	Destinations	Notes
Sandisfield	0.000	0.000	Route 8 south – Winsted	Continuation into Connecticut
Sandisfield	4.167	6.706	Route 57 east – Tolland, Southwick	Southern end of Route 57 concurrency
Sandisfield	4.234	6.814	Route 57 west – New Marlborough	Northern end of Route 57 concurrency
Otis	12.047	19.388	Route 23 east – Blandford, Russell	Southern end of Route 23 concurrency
Otis	12.189	19.616	Route 23 west – Monterey, Great Barrington	Northern end of Route 23 concurrency
West Becket	17.644	28.395	US 20 west – Pittsfield	Southern end of US 20 concurrency
Becket	22.860	36.790	US 20 east – Springfield	Northern end of US 20 concurrency
Hinsdale	38.095	61.308	Route 143 east – Peru, Worthington	Western terminus of Route 143
Dalton	41.718	67.139	Route 8A north / Route 9 east – Windsor, Northampton	Southern end of Route 9 concurrency; southern terminus of Route 8A (officially Route 8A-L)
Pittsfield	44.123	71.009	Route 9 west – Pittsfield	Northern end of Route 9 concurrency
Lanesborough	45.62	73.42	To US 7	Access via US 7–Route 8 Connector Road
Adams	56.170	90.397	Route 116 south	Northern terminus of Route 116
North Adams	59.476	95.717	Route 8A north – North Adams	Southern terminus of Route 8A (officially Route 8A-U)
North Adams	62.168	100.050	Route 2 west – Petersburg, NY, Troy, NY	Southern end of Route 2 concurrency
North Adams	62.370	100.375	Route 8A south – Pittsfield	Northern terminus of Route 8A (officially Route 8A-U)
North Adams	63.147	101.625	Route 2 east – Greenfield, Boston	Northern end of Route 2 concurrency
Clarksburg	66.643	107.252	VT 8 north / VT 100 north – Stamford	Continuation into Vermont
1.000 mi = 1.609 km; 1.000 km = 0.621 mi: Concurrency terminus
