= Searsburg, Vermont =

- Town
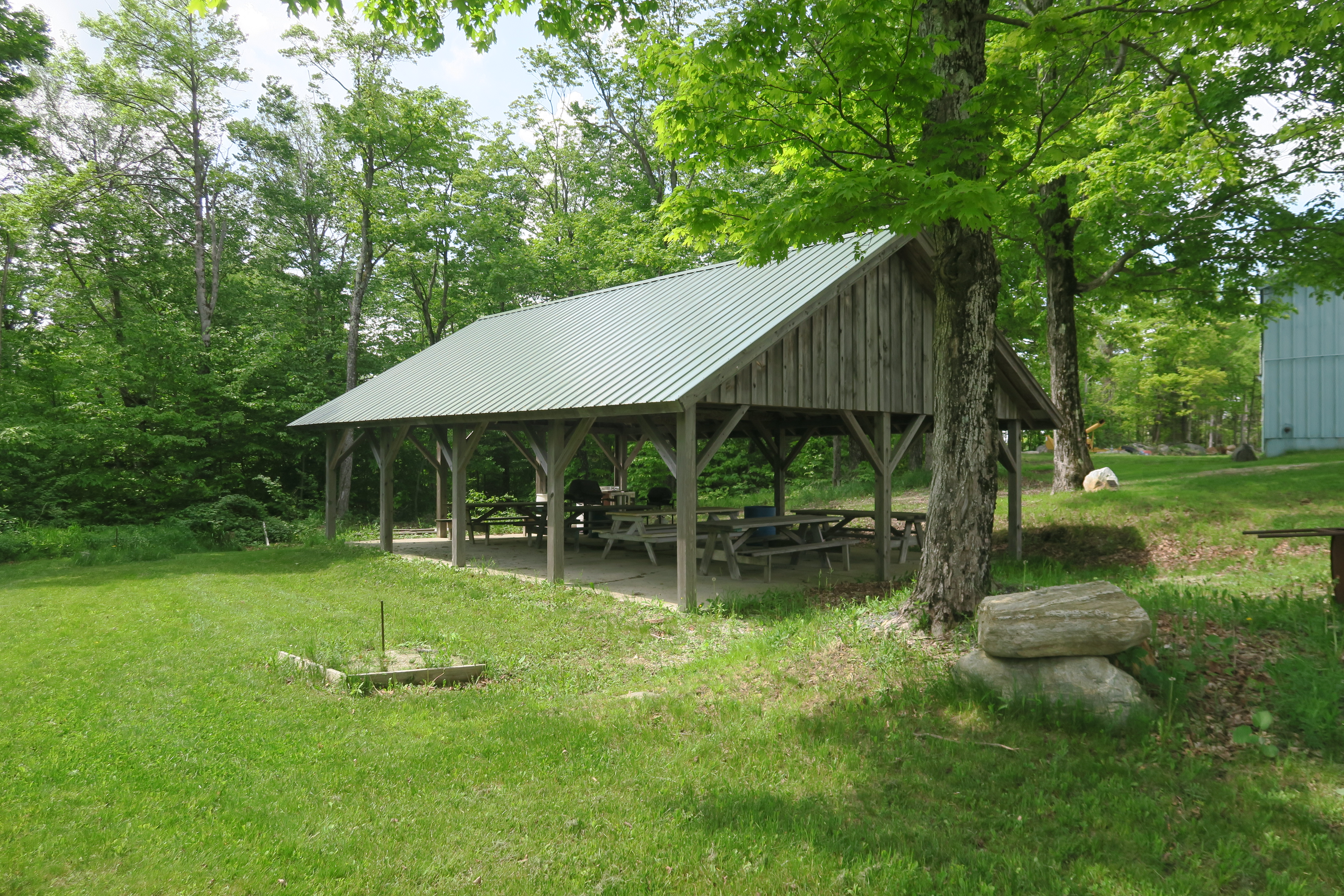
- Picnic shelter

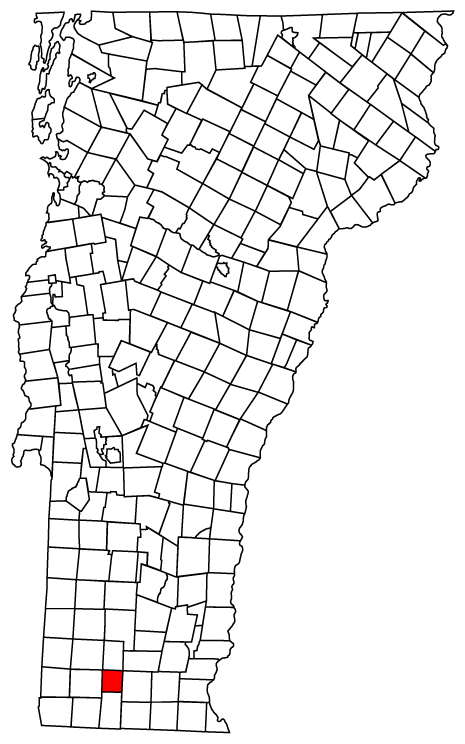
- Searsburg, Vermont
- Coordinates: 42°52′50″N 72°59′48″W
- Country: United States
- State: Vermont
- County: Bennington

Area
  - Total: 21.6 sq mi (55.9 km^{2})
  - Land: 21.4 sq mi (55.5 km^{2})
  - Water: 0.12 sq mi (0.3 km^{2})
- Elevation: 2,169 ft (661 m)

Population (2020)
  - Total: 126
  - Density: 6.0/sq mi (2.3/km^{2})
- Time zone: UTC-5 (Eastern (EST))
  - Summer (DST): UTC-4 (EDT)
- ZIP code: 05363
- Area code: 802
- FIPS code: 50-63175
- GNIS feature ID: 1462202

Searsburg is a town in Bennington County, Vermont, United States. The population was 126 at the 2020 census.

== Energy development ==
Searsburg is the home of a six-megawatt wind turbine farm owned by Green Mountain Power. The town officers have supported the electrical generating station consisting of 11 towers atop a ridgeline. The project is also an education and research facility for wind generation in the cold, northeast U.S. climate. There is a new wind project planned near the existing Searsburg Wind Energy Facility. Iberdrola Renewables proposed a 30 megawatt project, which consists of 15 turbines in Searsburg and Readsboro, on U.S. Forest Service land.

== Geography ==
Searsburg is located in southeastern Bennington County in the Green Mountains of Vermont. It is bordered to the north and east by Windham County. The town is traversed by Vermont Route 9, also known as the Molly Stark Trail. The highway leads east 24 miles (39 km) to Brattleboro and west 15 miles (24 km) to Bennington.

According to the United States Census Bureau, the town has a total area of 21.6 square miles (55.9 km^{2}), of which 21.4 square miles (55.5 km^{2}) is land and 0.12 square miles (0.3 km^{2}), or 0.59%, is water. The town is drained by the Deerfield River, a tributary of the Connecticut River.

== Demographics ==
Historical population
| Census | Pop. | Note | %± |
|---|---|---|---|
| 1820 | 9 | | — |
| 1830 | 40 | | 344.4% |
| 1840 | 120 | | 200.0% |
| 1850 | 201 | | 67.5% |
| 1860 | 262 | | 30.3% |
| 1870 | 235 | | −10.3% |
| 1880 | 232 | | −1.3% |
| 1890 | 173 | | −25.4% |
| 1900 | 161 | | −6.9% |
| 1910 | 142 | | −11.8% |
| 1920 | 133 | | −6.3% |
| 1930 | 103 | | −22.6% |
| 1940 | 135 | | 31.1% |
| 1950 | 84 | | −37.8% |
| 1960 | 73 | | −13.1% |
| 1970 | 84 | | 15.1% |
| 1980 | 72 | | −14.3% |
| 1990 | 85 | | 18.1% |
| 2000 | 96 | | 12.9% |
| 2010 | 109 | | 13.5% |
| 2020 | 126 | | 15.6% |
U.S. Decennial Census

As of the census of 2000, there were 96 people, 40 households, and 24 families residing in the town. The population density was 4.5 people per square mile (1.7/km^{2}). There were 87 housing units at an average density of 4.0 per square mile (1.6/km^{2}). The racial makeup of the town was 100.00% White.

There were 40 households, out of which 32.5% had children under the age of 18 living with them, 52.5% were married couples living together, 2.5% had a female householder with no husband present, and 40.0% were non-families. 37.5% of all households were made up of individuals, and 15.0% had someone living alone who was 65 years of age or older. The average household size was 2.40 and the average family size was 3.21.

In the town, the age distribution of the population shows 27.1% under the age of 18, 5.2% from 18 to 24, 25.0% from 25 to 44, 33.3% from 45 to 64, and 9.4% who were 65 years of age or older. The median age was 42 years. For every 100 females, there were 152.6 males. For every 100 females age 18 and over, there were 133.3 males.

The median income for a household in the town was $17,500, and the median income for a family was $31,667. Males had a median income of $28,333 versus $25,250 for females. The per capita income for the town was $10,472. There were 10.0% of families and 17.5% of the population living below the poverty line, including 12.9% of under eighteens and 35.7% of those over 64.

== Electoral history ==
- In 1992, Searsburg was one of four Vermont towns to support Reform candidate H. Ross Perot, who received 14 votes. Democrat Bill Clinton and Republican George H. W. Bush tied with 12 votes, with Marxist New Alliance Party member Lenora Fulani receiving one vote.
- In 1996, the town gave 45 percent to Clinton, with Perot polling at a significantly above-average 39 percent, and with Republican Bob Dole coming in a distant third.
- In 2000, Libertarian Harry Browne won Searsburg with 51%. Democrat Al Gore received 40%, and Ralph Nader received 9%. Republican George W. Bush received no votes. Browne's victory was particularly unusual, because he polled at under half a percent statewide.
- In 2004, however, third-party candidates received only 4 percent (one vote each for Nader and Libertarian Michael Badnarik). Democrat John Kerry defeated Bush, 30 votes to 22.
- In 2008, Searsburg was one of only three towns in Vermont to vote in favor of John McCain over Barack Obama (32–26).

US Presidential election, 2000: Searsburg, Vermont
| Party | Candidate | Votes | % | ±% |
|---|---|---|---|---|
| Libertarian | Harry Browne | 24 | 51.06% | |
| Democratic | Al Gore | 19 | 40.43% | |
| Green | Ralph Nader | 4 | 8.51% | |
| Republican | George W. Bush | 0 | 0.00% | |
| Majority | | 5 | 10.64% | |
| Turnout | | 47 | | |
| Libertarian gain from Democratic | | Swing | | |
