= Stamford, Vermont =

- Town
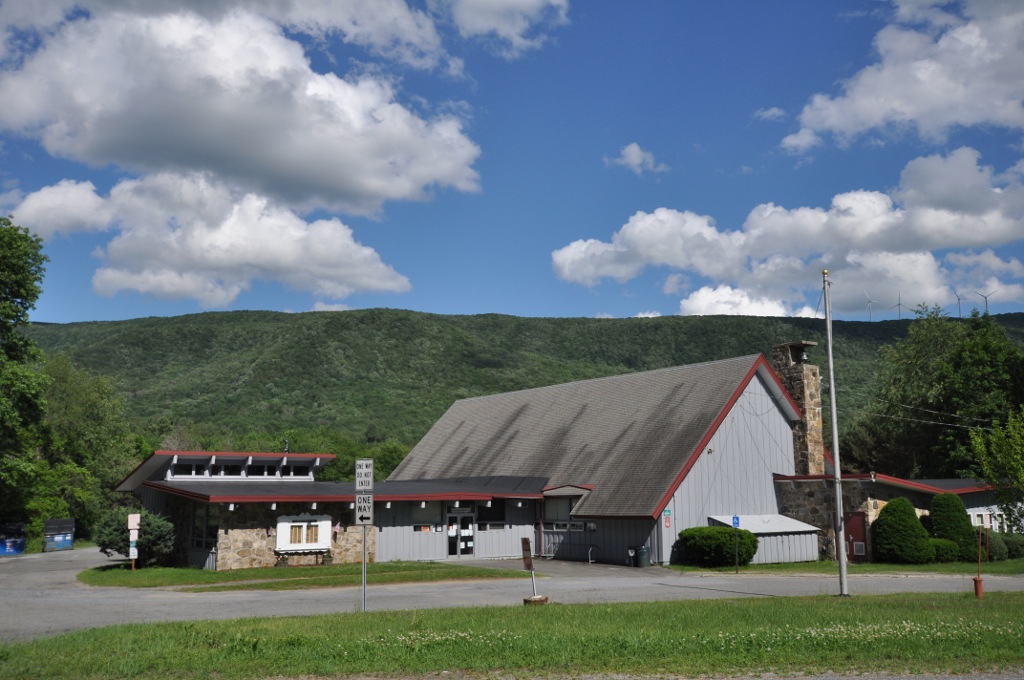
- Town building (town offices and school) in Stamford

- Wordmark

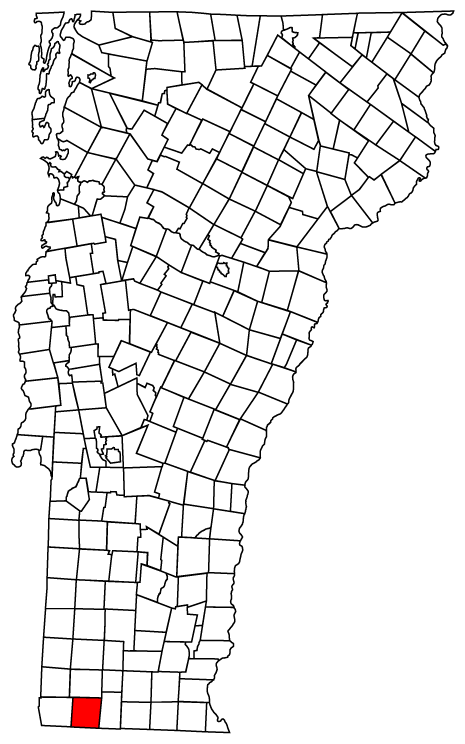
- Stamford, Vermont
- Coordinates: 42°46′12″N 73°07′28″W
- Country: United States
- State: Vermont
- County: Bennington

Area
  - Total: 39.6 sq mi (102.6 km^{2})
  - Land: 39.5 sq mi (102.3 km^{2})
  - Water: 0.12 sq mi (0.3 km^{2})
- Elevation: 2,097 ft (639 m)

Population (2020)
  - Total: 861
  - Density: 22/sq mi (8.4/km^{2})
- Time zone: UTC-5 (Eastern (EST))
  - Summer (DST): UTC-4 (EDT)
- ZIP code: 05352
- Area code: 802
- FIPS code: 50-69775
- GNIS feature ID: 1462215
- Website: townofstamfordvermont.org

Stamford is a town in Bennington County, Vermont, United States. The population was 861 at the 2020 census.

== Geography ==
Stamford is located near the southwestern corner of Vermont, on the Massachusetts state line. To the south of Stamford lie the towns of Clarksburg and Florida, Massachusetts. Stamford is also bordered by the Vermont towns of Pownal to the west, Readsboro to the east, and Woodford to the north. The village of Stamford is in the southern part of town, in the valley of the North Branch of the Hoosic River.

According to the United States Census Bureau, the town has a total area of 39.5 square miles (102.3 km^{2}), of which 39.5 square miles (102.4 km^{2}) is land and 0.12 square miles (0.3 km^{2}), or 0.29%, is water.

Two state-maintained routes share a concurrency through Stamford: Vermont Route 8 and Vermont Route 100. They are the only state highways through town, and the concurrency has its southern terminus at the Massachusetts state line.

== Demographics ==
Historical population
Census	Pop.	Note	%±
1790	272		—
1800	383		40.8%
1810	378		−1.3%
1820	490		29.6%
1830	563		14.9%
1840	662		17.6%
1850	833		25.8%
1860	759		−8.9%
1870	633		−16.6%
1880	726		14.7%
1890	645		−11.2%
1900	677		5.0%
1910	510		−24.7%
1920	374		−26.7%
1930	370		−1.1%
1940	418		13.0%
1950	514		23.0%
1960	600		16.7%
1970	752		25.3%
1980	773		2.8%
1990	773		0.0%
2000	813		5.2%
2010	824		1.4%
2020	861		4.5%
U.S. Decennial Census

As of the census of 2000, there were 813 people, 313 households, and 235 families residing in the town. The population density was 20.6 people per square mile (7.9/km^{2}). There were 387 housing units at an average density of 9.8 per square mile (3.8/km^{2}). The racial makeup of the town was 98.52% White, 0.25% Native American, 0.37% Asian, and 0.86% from two or more races. Hispanic or Latino of any race were 0.25% of the population.

There were 313 households, out of which 31.6% had children under the age of 18 living with them, 66.8% were married couples living together, 5.4% had a female householder with no husband present, and 24.9% were non-families. 16.9% of all households were made up of individuals, and 5.4% had someone living alone who was 65 years of age or older. The average household size was 2.60 and the average family size was 2.96.

In the town, the population was spread out, with 25.5% under the age of 18, 5.2% from 18 to 24, 28.4% from 25 to 44, 28.0% from 45 to 64, and 12.9% who were 65 years of age or older. The median age was 41 years. For every 100 females, there were 102.7 males. For every 100 females age 18 and over, there were 96.8 males.

The median income for a household in the town was $48,988, and the median income for a family was $49,345. Males had a median income of $39,196 versus $24,375 for females. The per capita income for the town was $19,575. About 2.4% of families and 3.8% of the population were below the poverty line, including 1.7% of those under age 18 and 11.6% of those age 65 or over.

== Notable people ==
- Leroy Lawrence (1908–1997), Speaker of the Vermont House of Representatives
- Stephen C. Millard (1841–1914), U.S. congressman from New York
- Ezra Miller (1992–), actor
- Susan Sarandon (1946–), actress
