= Jacksonville, Vermont =

- Village
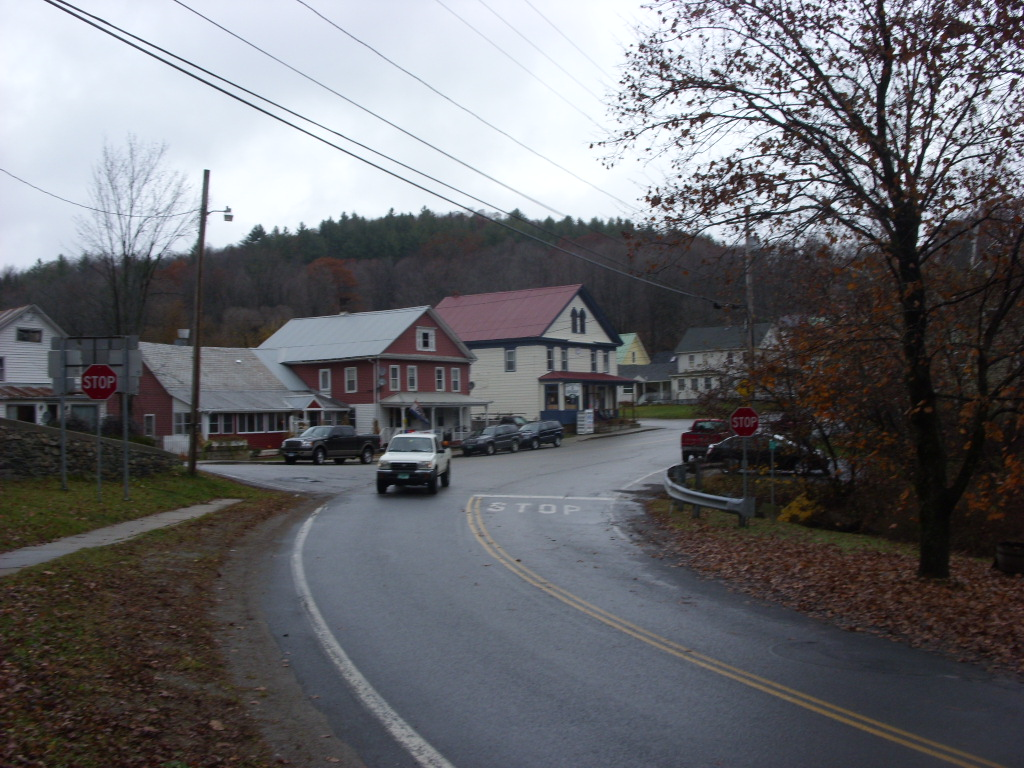
- Street in Jacksonville, Vermont

- Location within the state of Vermont
- Coordinates: 42°47′51″N 72°49′09″W
- Country: United States
- State: Vermont
- County: Windham
- Town: Whitingham

Area
  - Total: 1.16 sq mi (3.01 km^{2})
  - Land: 1.14 sq mi (2.95 km^{2})
  - Water: 0.027 sq mi (0.07 km^{2})
- Elevation: 1,408 ft (429 m)

Population (2020)
  - Total: 213
  - Density: 187/sq mi (72.2/km^{2})
- Time zone: UTC-5 (Eastern (EST))
  - Summer (DST): UTC-4 (EDT)
- ZIP code: 05342
- Area code: 802
- FIPS code: 50-36025
- GNIS feature ID: 2378308

Jacksonville is a village in the town of Whitingham, Windham County, Vermont, United States. The population was 213 at the 2020 census.

== Geography ==
According to the United States Census Bureau, the village has a total area of 1.2 square miles (3.0 km^{2}), of which 1.1 square miles (3.0 km^{2}) is land and 0.04 square mile (0.1 km^{2}) (1.71%) is water.

=== Climate ===
This climatic region is typified by large seasonal temperature differences, with warm to hot (and often humid) summers and cold (sometimes severely cold) winters. According to the Köppen Climate Classification system, Jacksonville has a humid continental climate, abbreviated "Dfb" on climate maps.

== Demographics ==
Historical population
Census	Pop.	Note	%±
1910	212		—
1920	221		4.2%
1930	220		−0.5%
1940	240		9.1%
1950	220		−8.3%
1960	240		9.1%
1970	251		4.6%
1980	252		0.4%
1990	244		−3.2%
2000	237		−2.9%
2010	223		−5.9%
2020	213		−4.5%
U.S. Decennial Census

As of the census of 2000, there were 237 people, 88 households, and 60 families residing in the village. The population density was 207.5 people per square mile (80.3/km^{2}). There were 108 housing units at an average density of 94.6/sq mi (36.6/km^{2}). The racial makeup of the village was 98.73% White, 0.84% Native American, and 0.42% from two or more races. Hispanic or Latino of any race were 1.27% of the population.

There were 88 households, out of which 43.2% had children under the age of 18 living with them, 54.5% were married couples living together, 10.2% had a female householder with no husband present, and 31.8% were non-families. 23.9% of all households were made up of individuals, and 10.2% had someone living alone who was 65 years of age or older. The average household size was 2.69 and the average family size was 3.28.

In the village, the population was spread out, with 29.1% under the age of 18, 11.4% from 18 to 24, 30.4% from 25 to 44, 18.6% from 45 to 64, and 10.5% who were 65 years of age or older. The median age was 33 years. For every 100 females, there were 76.9 males. For every 100 females age 18 and over, there were 76.8 males.

The median income for a household in the village was $33,438, and the median income for a family was $34,821. Males had a median income of $26,500 versus $21,786 for females. The per capita income for the village was $17,485. About 9.8% of families and 9.2% of the population were below the poverty line, including 16.2% of those under the age of eighteen and 18.5% of those 65 or over.

== Notable person ==
- William E. Roberts, member of the New Hampshire House of Representatives
