= Park Street Firehouse =

- U.S. National Register of Historic Places
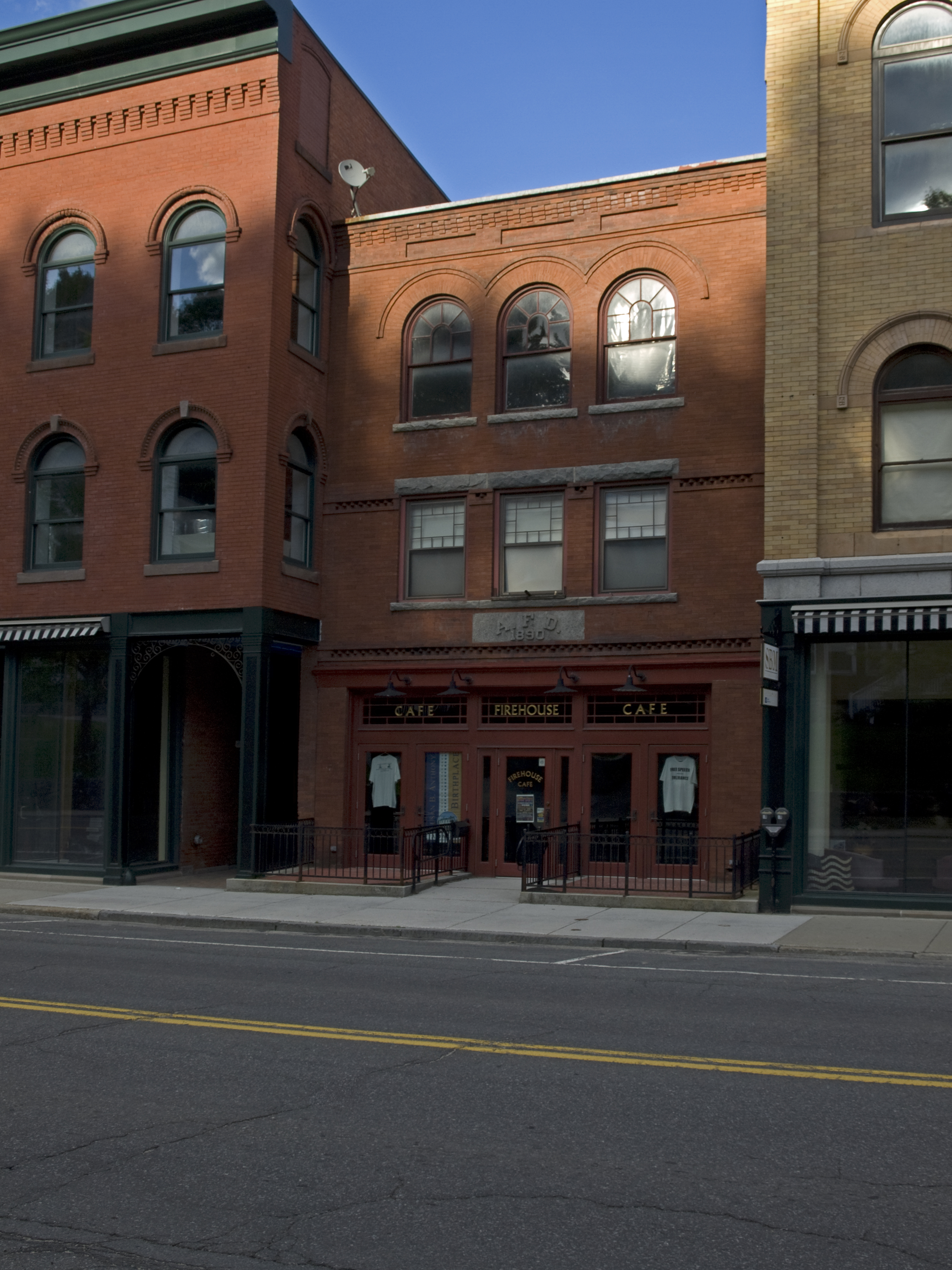

- Location within Massachusetts Location within the United States
- Location: 47 Park St., Adams, Massachusetts
- Coordinates: 42°37′20″N 73°7′11.769″W
- Area: less than one acre
- Built: 1890
- Architectural style: Queen Anne
- NRHP reference No.: 82004949
- Added to NRHP: January 28, 1982

The Park Street Firehouse is an historic fire station in Adams, Massachusetts. It was built around 1890, during the boom of Adams' industrial facilities, and is a prominent local example of Queen Anne Victorian architecture executed in brick. The station, now in commercial use, was listed on the National Register of Historic Places in 1982.

== Description and history ==
The Park Street Firehouse is located in the town center of Adams, on the east side of Park Street, between the Armory Block and the Jones Block, two later buildings that dwarf it in height, even though all three are three stories. It is built out of red brick, with ground floor equipment bays altered to support commercial use. The second floor has a band of three sash windows, and the third floor also has three windows, but they are individually set in round-arch openings. The building is particularly distinctive for its window treatments, which include small panes of colored glass in the second floor windows.

The Adams Fire District was established in 1872 as a quasi-public fire protection service, dominated by local mill owners. The district's fire protection services extended to other buildings located in villages near the mills for a fee. This building was the second built for the district, and appears to have been designed as a larger facility than those located in other villages. The upper floors originally housed apartments. Later in the 20th century, the building was adapted for use by an ambulance service.

In the early 2000's the first and second floors were converted into a restaurant. Several types of food establishments have opened and closed since 2010.

== See also ==
- National Register of Historic Places listings in Berkshire County, Massachusetts
