= Jones Block =

Jones Block may mean:

- Jones Block (Adams, Massachusetts)
- Jones Block (Los Angeles)
