= Summer Street =

Summer Street may refer to:

- Summer Street (Boston), a street in Boston, Massachusetts
  - 100 Summer Street, a building on Summer Street
- Summer Streets, an annual summer event in New York City
- Summer Street Historic District, the name of several historic districts in the United States
