= Renfrew Mill No. 2 =

- U.S. National Register of Historic Places
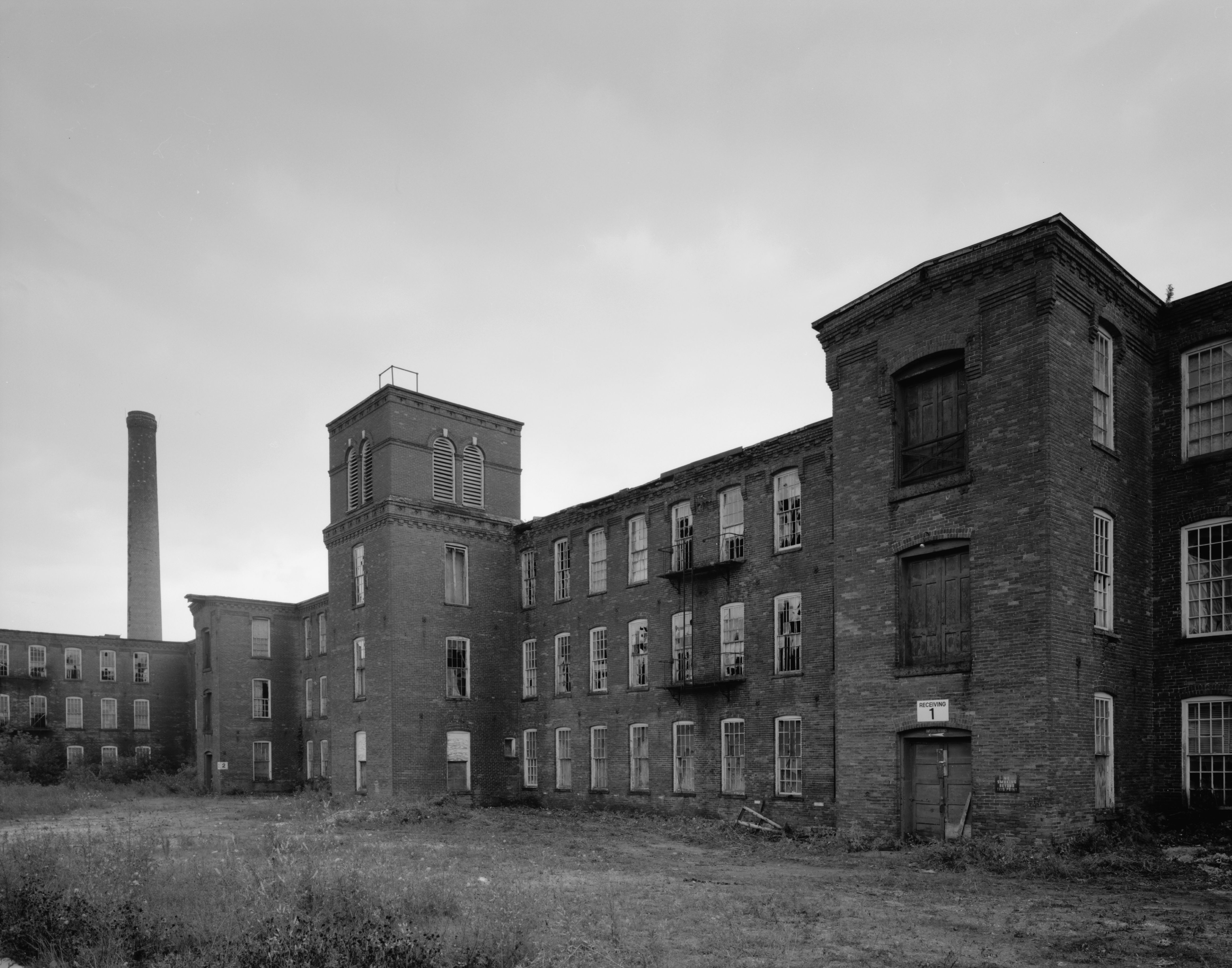

- Location within Massachusetts Location within the United States
- Location: Adams, Massachusetts
- Coordinates: 42°38′15″N 73°6′26″W
- Area: 15.2 acres (6.2 ha)
- Built: 1868
- Architect: Whiting, W. H. H.
- Architectural style: Gothic, Italianate
- NRHP reference No.: 82000474
- Added to NRHP: October 14, 1982

The Renfrew Mill No. 2 was a historic mill complex at 217 Columbia Street in Adams, Massachusetts. Most of its buildings were built between 1867 and 1878, and were brick buildings with Italianate styling. They were built by the Renfrew Manufacturing Company, a textile manufacturer, to replace an earlier complex further down Columbia Street that had been demolished. The property was acquired by the Arnold Print Works in 1928. The mill was the town's largest employer for much of the second half of the 19th century.

The complex was listed on the National Register of Historic Places in 1982. It was destroyed by fire in November 1984.

== Description and history ==
The Renfrew Mill No. 2 was located north of downtown Adams, on 15 acres (6.1 ha) bounded on the north by Lime Street, the east by the Hoosic River, the west by railroad tracks, and the south by the former site of its mill pond. A raceway running parallel to the railroad tracks channeled water from the river to power the mills. The mill complex had 25 buildings, ranging in construction dates from 1867 to the 20th century. Most were of brick construction, ranging in height from one to three stories. The main mill building was a 350-foot (110 m) three-story building, with an Italianate tower near the center of its western facade. The office, located north of the main structure, was a two-story brick building with Victorian Gothic features.

The Renfrew Company was founded in 1867 by local businessmen who were previously engaged in either the textile business or paper manufacturing. The company acquired a large parcel of land, which straddled Columbia Street south of Lime Street. On this they built two mills (neither now standing) and tracts of mill worker housing (some of which survives). The company at first manufactured cotton gingham fabric. The company expanded during the late 19th century, employing more than 2,500 people in Adams and North Adams. The company closed down in 1928, and this facility was purchased by the Arnold Print Works. Arnold went bankrupt in 1981, and the complex was destroyed by fire in 1984.

== See also ==
- National Register of Historic Places listings in Berkshire County, Massachusetts
