= Maple Street Cemetery =

Historic cemetery in Massachusetts, United States

- U.S. National Register of Historic Places
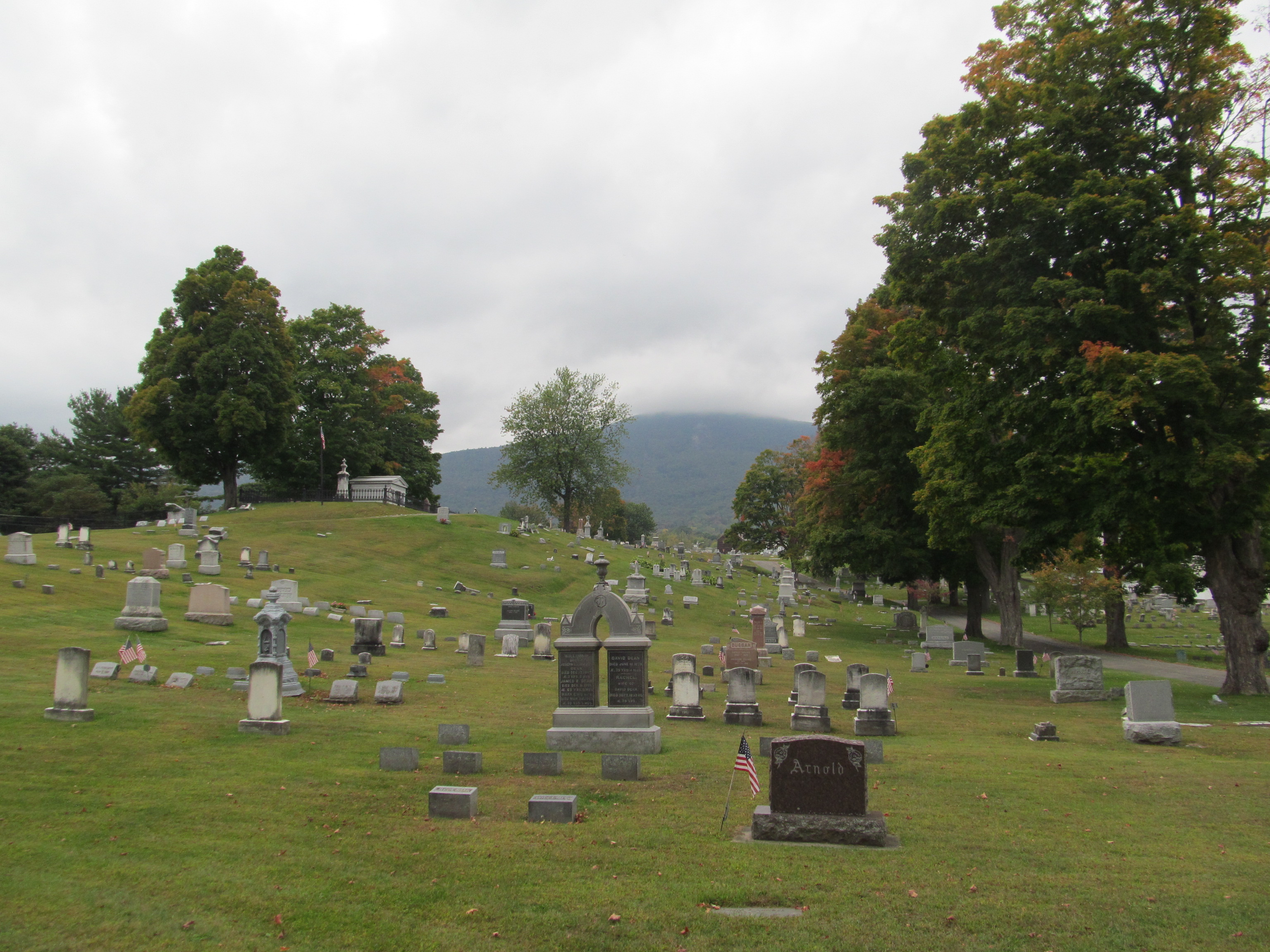

- Location within Massachusetts Location within the United States
- Location: Maple St., Adams, Massachusetts
- Coordinates: 42°37′35″N 73°7′29″W
- Built: 1767
- Architect: Charles F. Sayles
- NRHP reference No.: 04000536
- Added to NRHP: June 2, 2004

Maple Street Cemetery is a historic cemetery on Maple Street in Adams, Massachusetts. Established about 1760, it is the town's oldest cemetery, serving as a burying ground for its early Quaker settlers, as well as for some of its prominent 19th-century citizens. It was listed on the National Register of Historic Places in 2004.

== Description and history ==
The Maple Street Cemetery occupies 16 acres (6.5 ha) of land north of Adams' central business district, stretched along the north side of Maple Street between Forest Park Avenue and Notch Road. The setting is on a rise above the plain of the Hoosic River, with nearby Mount Greylock as a backdrop to the west.

The cemetery is Adams' oldest, with its earliest burials dating to 1760. This first small plot, housing the unmarked graves of Adams' early Quaker settlers, is near the listed Quaker Meetinghouse (built 1784). A second town-owned cemetery, established before 1800 at the eastern end of the current parcel, was joined with it in 1859 to form a single town-owned cemetery. A major update of its landscape was implemented in the late 1860s to a design by local civil engineer Charles F. Sayles, in which the present network of roads and lanes was established. During the 1930s the cemetery infrastructure underwent some rehabilitation, and a project of the Works Projects Administration lined the cemetery roadways with locally quarried marble.

The largest and most elaborate funerary monument is that of the Plunkett family, which owned and operated some of the town's mills. A second cemetery was not laid out in Adams until 1888, when Bellevue Cemetery was established.

== See also ==
- National Register of Historic Places listings in Berkshire County, Massachusetts
