= Mausert Block =

- U.S. National Register of Historic Places
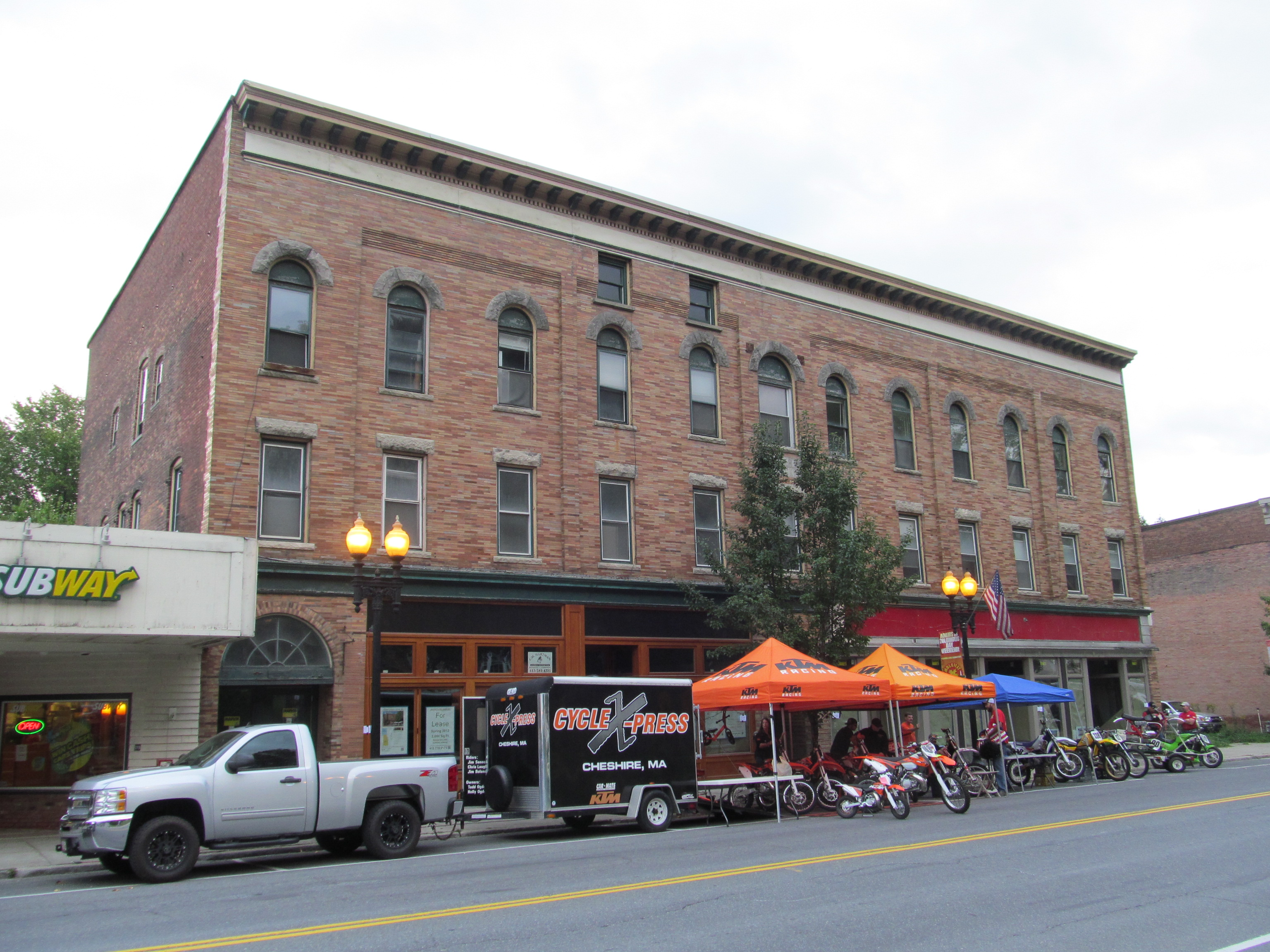
- Mausert Block

- Location within Massachusetts Location within the United States
- Location: 19-25 Park St., Adams, Massachusetts
- Coordinates: 42°37′17″N 73°7′14″W
- Area: less than one acre
- Built: 1901
- Architect: James Fleming
- Architectural style: Romanesque
- NRHP reference No.: 82004948
- Added to NRHP: April 1, 1982

The Mausert Block is a historic commercial building at 19—25 Park Street in Adams, Massachusetts. Built in 1900-01, it is a prominent local example of Romanesque Revival architecture. It is one of the four brick buildings on Park Street along with the P. J. Barrett Block, Jones Block, and Armory Block, and was listed on the National Register of Historic Places in 1982.

== Description and history ==
The Mausert Block is located in the town center of Adams, on the east side of Park Street roughly opposite town hall. It is a three-story brick building with a twelve-bay facade and a flat roof with a projecting modillioned and dentillated cornice. Windows on the second floor are rectangular, with rough-cut stone sills and lintels, while those on the third floor have round-arch tops with keystones. The ground level is divided into multiple storefronts, with the main building entrance near the center, recessed in a round-arch openings. A secondary round-arch opening at the southern end of the building provides access to a small retail space.

The Mausert Block was built in 1900 and 1901 by George and Conrad Mausert, brothers and local businessmen. Walter J Donovan established his law offices on the second floor from 1920 until 1970. F.W. Woolworth moved into 19-21 Park Street in 1930s. It once contained the Adams Masonic Hall, and the town's first telephone exchange.

In 2009 the building was formally condemned, although its tenants were not evicted, the building became vacant soon after. It was purchased by Braytonville Properties in 2011, and rehabilitation begun in 2012 with the completion of new storefronts along Park Street. Working through a number of challenges including a court case and the covid pandemic, ten new apartments were completed in 2022. The project included integrated local art in common spaces and featured restored stained glass windows. The historical rehabilitation received the Robert H. Kuehn award for melding collaborative partnerships with creative and cutting-edge ideas and also the Preservation Massachusetts People's Preservation Choice Award.

== See also ==
- National Register of Historic Places listings in Berkshire County, Massachusetts
