= Summer Street Historic District =

Summer Street Historic District may refer to:

- Summer Street Historic District (Adams, Massachusetts), listed on the National Register of Historic Places in Berkshire County, Massachusetts
- Summer Street Historic District (St. Johnsbury, Vermont), listed on the National Register of Historic Places in Caledonia County, Vermont
