= Berkshire Arts & Technology Charter Public School =

Coordinates: 42.6218°N 73.1195°W

- Adams, Massachusetts; United States

Information
- Type: Charter Public
- Established: 2004
- Principal: Joe Huston
- Director: Johnathan Igoe
- Grades: 6–12
- Enrollment: 203 Middle school 151 High school Total: 354, as of 2017
- Colors: Purple, gold, black
- Athletics: Cross Country, Soccer, Basketball, Ultimate Frisbee, Volleyball
- Website: www.bartcharter.org

Berkshire Arts & Technology Charter Public School (BART), located in Adams, United States is a tuition-free, college-preparatory public school serving 6th through 12th grade students in Berkshire County. Students may enter in 6th through 10th grade, no new students are accepted in the 11th or 12th grade year.

BART primarily serves students in Adams, Cheshire, Clarksburg, Florida, Hancock, Lanesborough, North Adams, Pittsfield, Savoy and Williamstown. Students from other towns may enroll if space is available.

== Curriculum ==
BART students take courses in the following disciplines:

- Arts
- Music
- Physical fitness
- English
- History
- Math
- Science
- Spanish (high school only)
- Collegiate skills and junior/senior seminar

== Sports ==
BART has a co-ed cross country running team, soccer team, Ultimate team, Volleyball team, and basketball team, in addition to a girls basketball team. The cross country team is open to students in the 6th through 12th grade, all other teams are available to students in the 8th grade and above. BART is a member of the River Valley Athletic League (RVAL), which comprises independent and charter schools in the greater Pioneer Valley region. Students must have passing grades (70% or higher) in all classes in order to participate in school athletics to promote the idea of the scholar-athlete.
