= P. J. Barrett Block =

- U.S. National Register of Historic Places
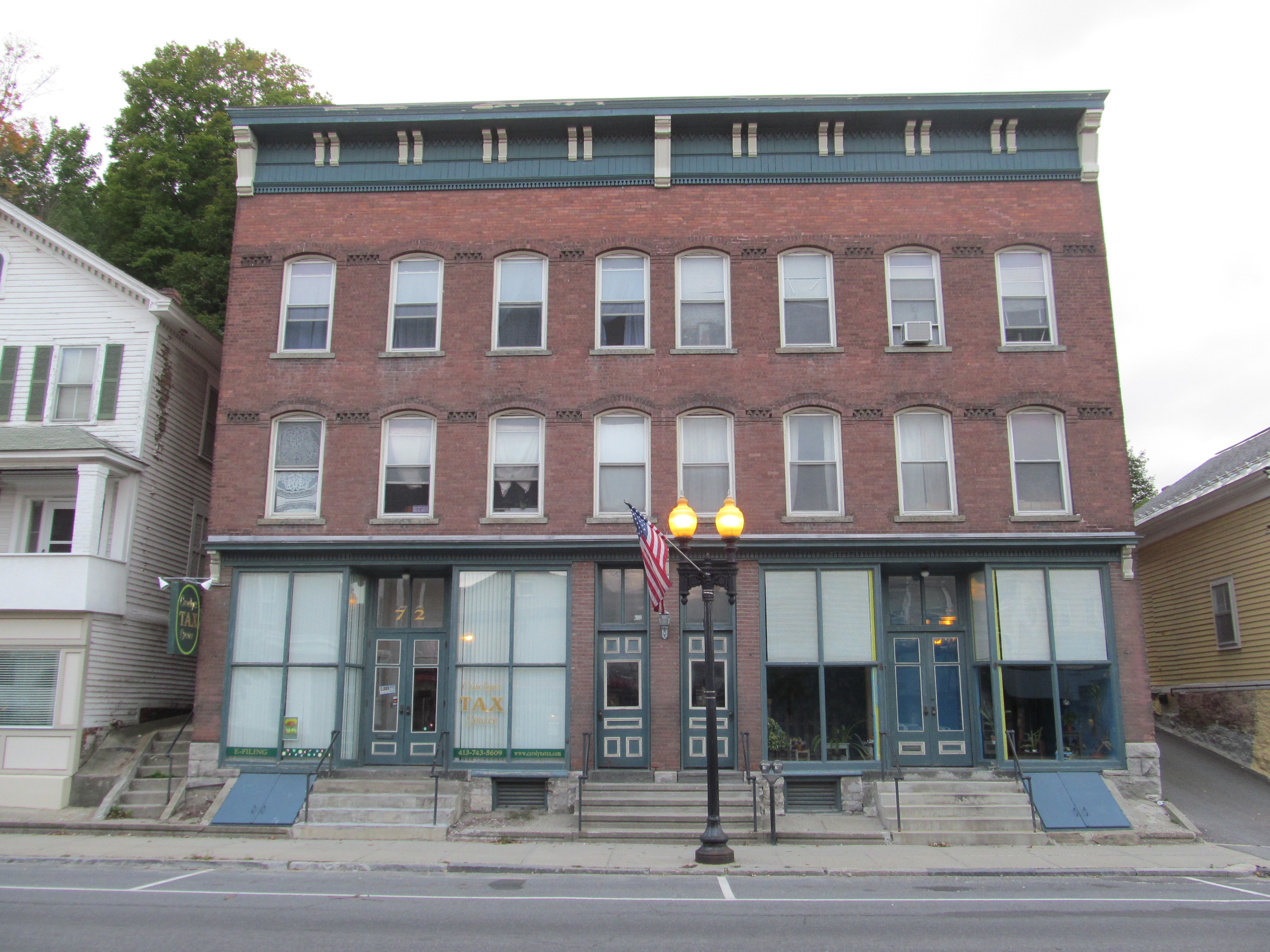
- P. J. Barrett Block

- Location within Massachusetts Location within the United States
- Location: 70–76 Park Street, Adams, Massachusetts
- Coordinates: 42°37′24″N 73°7′15″W
- Built: 1880
- Architectural style: Italianate
- NRHP reference No.: 82004945
- Added to NRHP: April 1, 1982

The P.J. Barrett Block is a historic block in Adams, Massachusetts. It is one of the four brick buildings on Park Street along with the Jones Block, Armory Block, and the Mausert Block, opposite the Town Hall. The block was built in roughly 1880, during a period of rapid industrial expansion in Adams. The original uses of the building were to provide retail shops on the ground floor and apartment-style housing above, a common feature of buildings of the period. It has a somewhat utilitarian appearance, which may be reflective of the relative haste in which it was designed and built. The building has a brick face, and the windows on the upper floors have curved pediments. The building was listed on the National Register of Historic Places in 1982.

In 1984, after a period of abandonment, the building was rehabilitated by Dawson Associates into two commercial spaces and eight apartments of affordable housing. Financing was a blended form from an area bank, the (then) Massachusetts Government Land Bank under a pilot program to encourage changes in local tax abatement procedures to incentivize the redevelopment of abandoned properties, and the Town of Adams. Dawson Associates consisted of Mr. Donald Ruffer a prominent area Realtor, Mr. Richard Moscatelli, executive director of Housing Now, and Carter Terenzini, the City of Pittsfield's first Commissioner of Community and Economic Development and subsequently a Principal of RCT Associates. All were from Pittsfield, MA.

In June 2016, a fire on a stove in a third floor apartment, displaced four families and resulted in damage to the upper floors and attic.

== See also ==
- National Register of Historic Places listings in Berkshire County, Massachusetts
