= Quaker Meetinghouse (Adams, Massachusetts) =

Historic church in Massachusetts, United States

- U.S. National Register of Historic Places
- U.S. Historic district – Contributing property
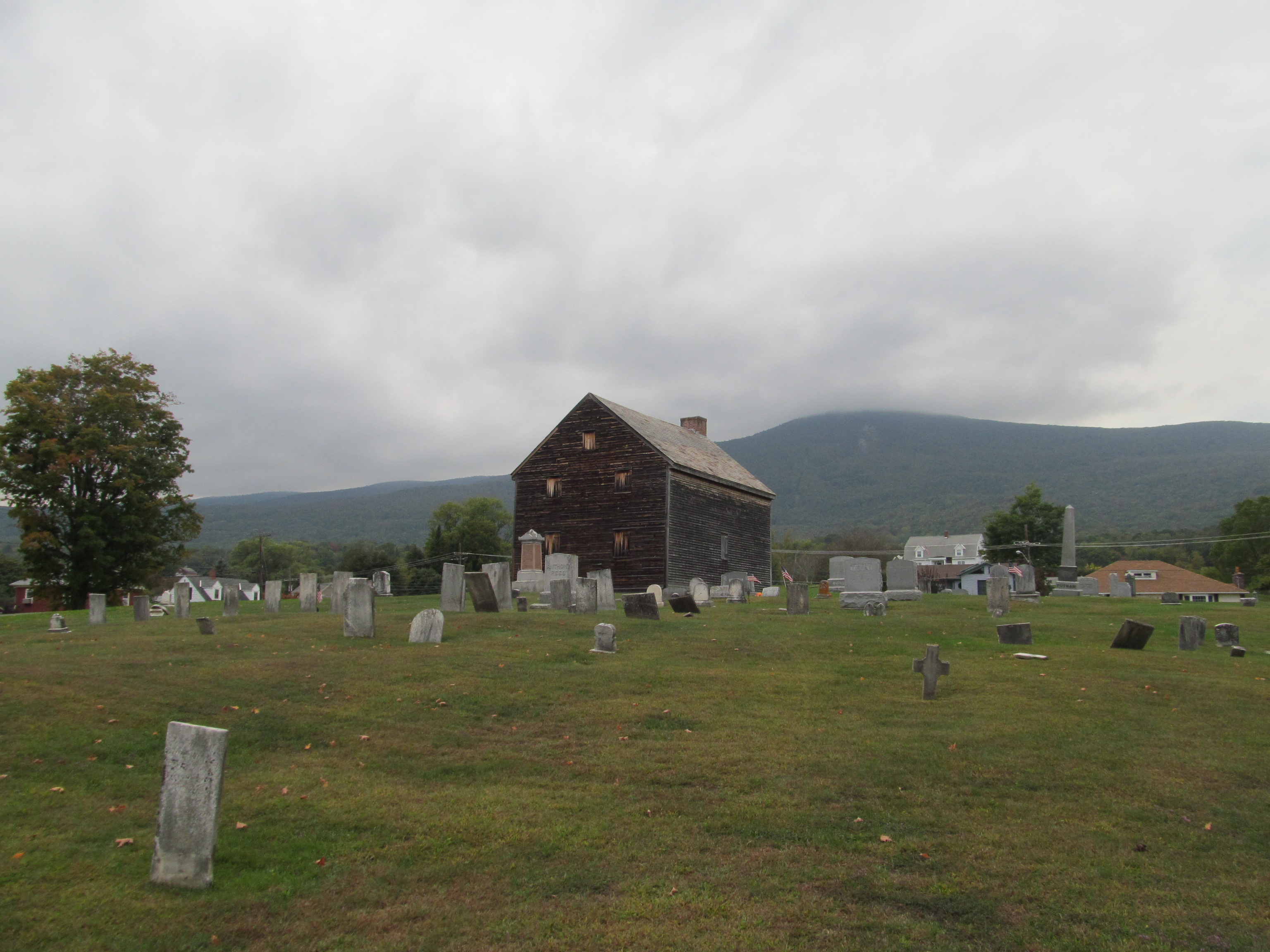
- The meetinghouse is surrounded by the graves of the Maple Street Cemetery

- Location within Massachusetts Location within the United States
- Location: Maple Street Cemetery, Adams, Massachusetts
- Coordinates: 42°37′38″N 73°7′34″W
- Built: 1781
- Part of: Maple Street Cemetery (ID04000536)
- NRHP reference No.: 76000236

Significant dates
- Added to NRHP: August 17, 1976
- Designated CP: June 2, 2004

The East Hoosac Quaker Meetinghouse is a historic Quaker meeting house in Adams, Berkshire County, Massachusetts. The meetinghouse's construction dates to the early 1780s. It now occupies a prominent position within the Maple Street Cemetery (also listed on the National Register of Historic Places), the first burial ground in Adams. Unmarked graves of Adams' early Quaker settlers lie near the meetinghouse, an area now marked by a plaque. The meetinghouse was listed on the National Register of Historic Places in 1976.

== Description and history ==
The Quaker Meetinghouse occupies a prominent position overlooking the Maple Street Cemetery from a high point near its western end. It is a simple rectangular two story wood frame building measuring 28 feet (8.5 m) by 36 feet (11 m). In typical Quaker fashion, both the interior and exterior lack any significant ornamentation. The exterior is finished in wooden clapboards, and has an asymmetrical main facade with two entrances, one for men and one for women. The doors and outside window shutters are made of simple wooden planking. A chimney pierces the roof ridge near the building's western end. The interior was partitioned to separate the men from the women, although portions of the divider were movable. Seating consisted of benches, and there were fireplaces located on the women's side of both floors.

Adams was first settled by Quakers, mostly from the area of Smithfield, Rhode Island, in the 1760s, and was originally known as East Hoosac. The present meetinghouse dates to 1784, and remained in active use until 1842, when the local Quaker population was in decline. The area of the cemetery near the meetinghouse has archaeologically been determined to have unmarked graves of Quakers (a common practice of time) dating to the 1760s. Relatives of noted suffragette Susan B. Anthony, who was born in Adams, are buried here.

== See also ==
- National Register of Historic Places listings in Berkshire County, Massachusetts
