= Summer Street Historic District (Adams, Massachusetts) =

Historic district in Massachusetts, United States

- U.S. National Register of Historic Places
- U.S. Historic district
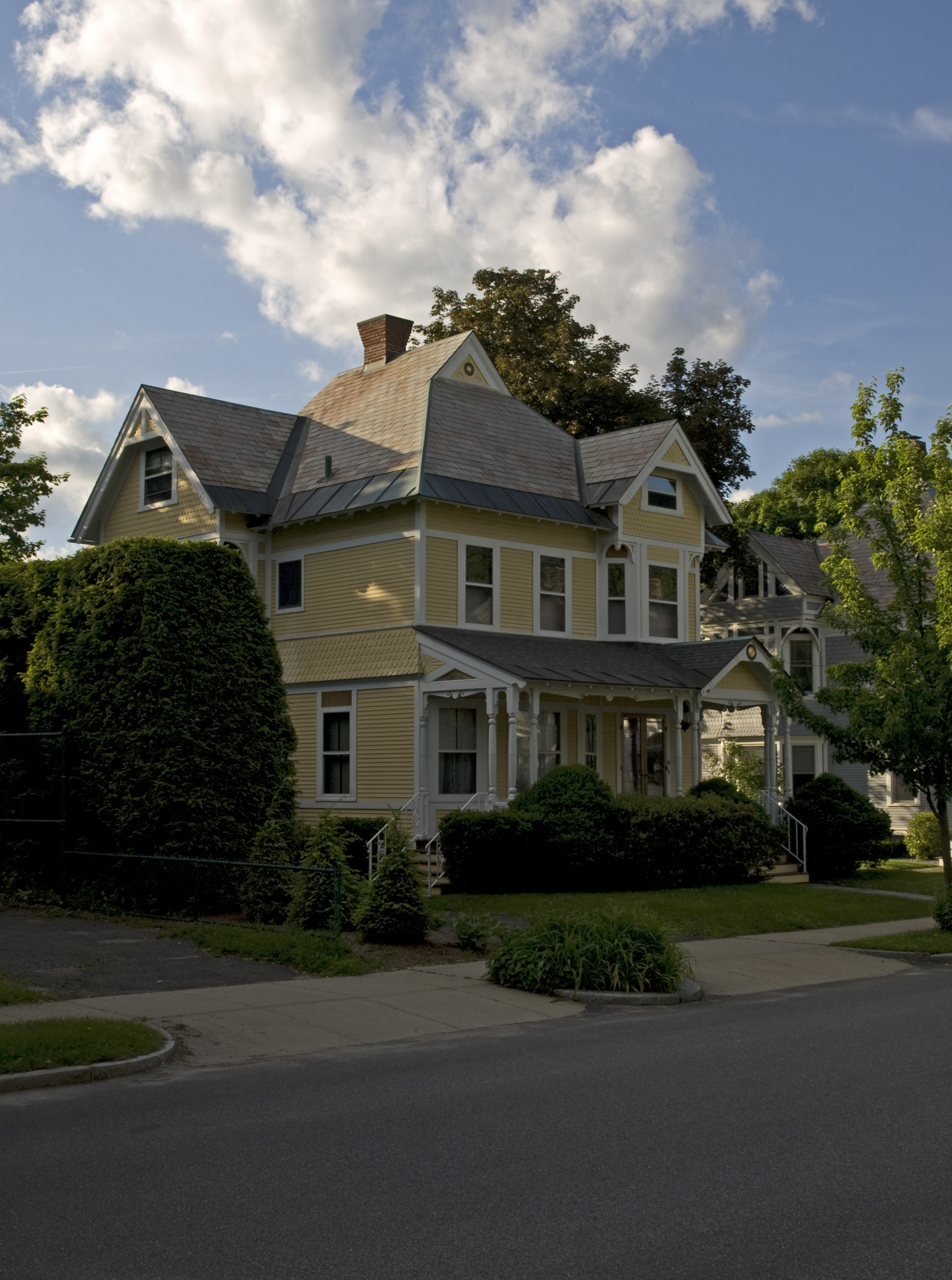
- 30 Summer Street

- Location within Massachusetts Location within the United States
- Location: Crandall, Center, East, Liberty, Orchard and Summer Streets, Adams, Massachusetts
- Coordinates: 42°37′7″N 73°7′1″W
- Area: 27 acres (11 ha)
- Architect: Multiple
- Architectural style: Greek Revival, Late Victorian, Federal
- NRHP reference No.: 85002009
- Added to NRHP: September 5, 1985

The Summer Street Historic District encompasses a fashionable 19th-century residential area of Adams, Massachusetts. Centered on the junction of Summer Street with Center and Orchard Streets, it extends mainly north along Summer Street, and includes fine examples of Greek Revival, Late Victorian, and Federal style architecture. It was listed on the National Register of Historic Places in 1985.

== Description and history ==
The town of Adams was settled by colonists in 1762, and was incorporated in 1778; its northern section was separated as North Adams in 1878. Early settlement took place on the eastern bank of the Hoosac River, along the area's main stagecoach route (now roughly Center and Orchard Streets). Industry developed along the river in the 19th century, and Summer Street, which roughly parallels the river on a rise to its east, became a fashionable neighborhood for the community's merchant and business elite. As the town industrialized in the 1830s and 1840s, a number of fine Greek Revival houses were built there, and it experienced a second major development push in the late 19th century, when a large number of Victorian homes were built.

The principal avenue of the historic district is the block of Summer Street extending from Randall Street in the north to the junction with Center, Orchard, and Crandall Streets in the south. A number of properties are included along those three streets as well as side streets immediately adjacent. The district has 75 historic buildings, most of which are single-family residences built out of wood. Two church buildings (one now serving as a Masonic lodge) face each other across Center Street, and are included in the district, as are a series of early 20th-century multi-unit rowhouses. The streets are typically lined with trees, and the houses have modest setbacks. Particularly fine architectural examples include 72 Center Street, a c. 1840 Greek Revival house, and 4 Orchard Street, a detailed example of Second Empire architecture built in 1870.

== See also ==
- National Register of Historic Places listings in Berkshire County, Massachusetts
