= Armory Block =

- U.S. National Register of Historic Places
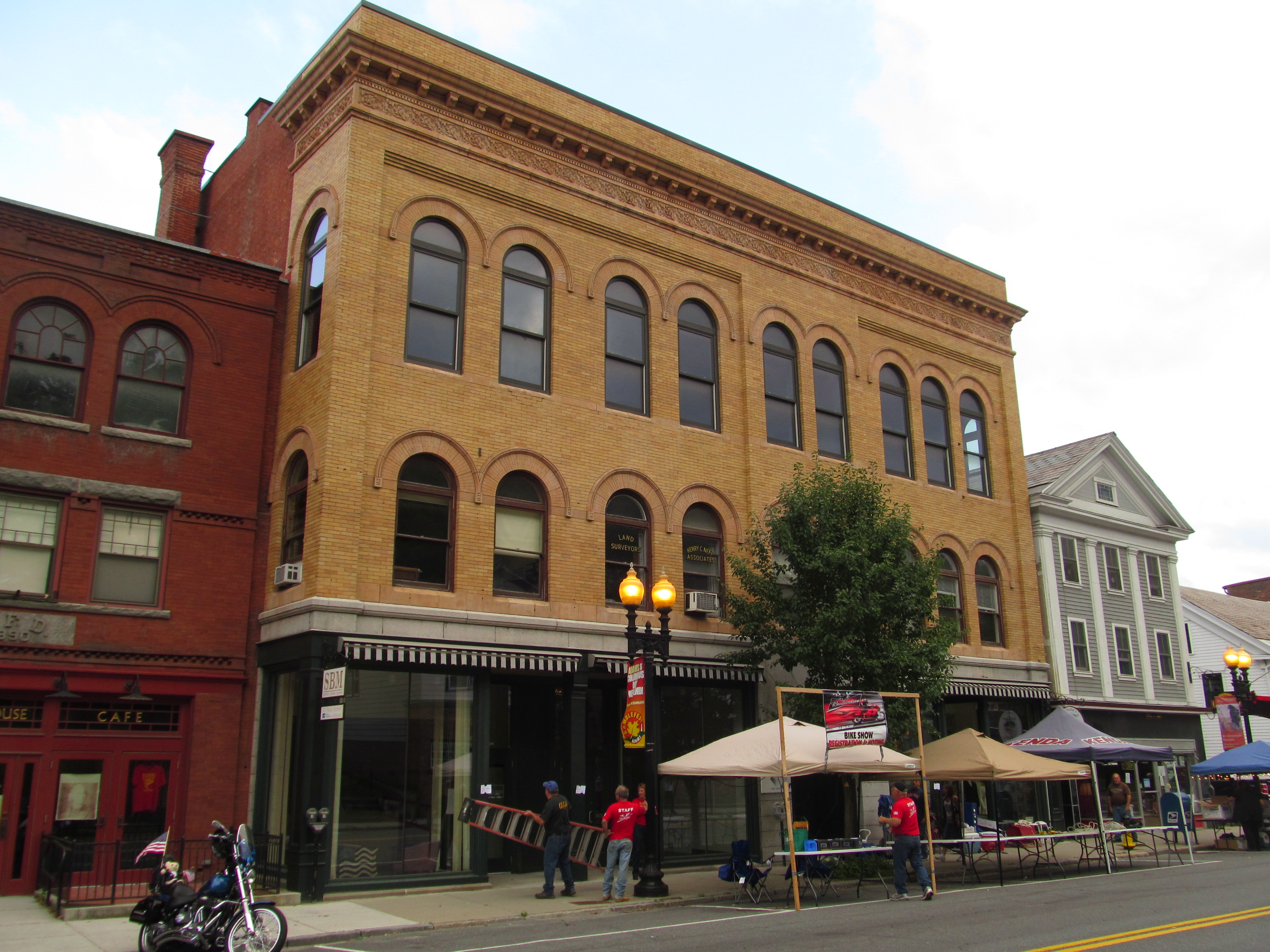
- Armory Block

- Location within Massachusetts Location within the United States
- Location: 39-45 Park St., Adams, Massachusetts
- Coordinates: 42°37′20″N 73°7′14″W
- Area: less than one acre
- Built: 1894
- Architectural style: Renaissance Revival
- NRHP reference No.: 82004944
- Added to NRHP: April 1, 1982

The Armory Block is a historic commercial building at 39-45 Park Street in Adams, Massachusetts. Built in 1894-95, it is a fine example of Renaissance Revival architecture, and one of the town's most architecturally sophisticated commercial buildings. It served as the local National Guard armory until 1914, and now houses commercial businesses. It was listed on the National Historic Register in 1982.

== Description and history ==
The Armory Block is located in downtown Adams, on the east side of Park Street almost opposite the First Congregational Church. It is one of the four large brick buildings on Park Street along with the P. J. Barrett Block, Jones Block, and the Mausert Block. It is a three-story masonry structure, finished in yellow brick on the main facade, and red brick on the sides. The ground floor has three storefronts with recessed entries and glass display windows, with the building entrance to the right of the middle storefront in an arched surround. The upper floors are divided into three sections, with paired round-arch windows above the entrance. To its right is a slightly recessed panel with bands of three round-arch windows on each level, and on its left is a larger panel with two pairs of similar windows on each level. The building is crowned by a modillioned cornice and low parapet.

The block was built in 1894 by A.J. Daniel, a developer from a locally prominent family. It was built to serve as an armory for the Massachusetts National Guard, a role it fulfilled until new facilities were built in 1914. After it was decommissioned from military use in 1914 it was converted into retail space on the first floor, office space on the second and a bowling alley on the third floor. Alterations to the Armory Block have been relatively minor and its original use, and design remains essentially unaltered since the early twentieth century. In 2008, a $2 million investment was proposed but not completed and a subsequent uncompleted proposal made in 2016. In March 2023 the building was vacated due to a broken boiler that was prohibitively expensive to replace. The estimated time to replacement was between a few months and two years. As of 2026, the building remains vacant.

== See also ==
- National Register of Historic Places listings in Berkshire County, Massachusetts
