= Adams, Massachusetts =

Adams
- Town
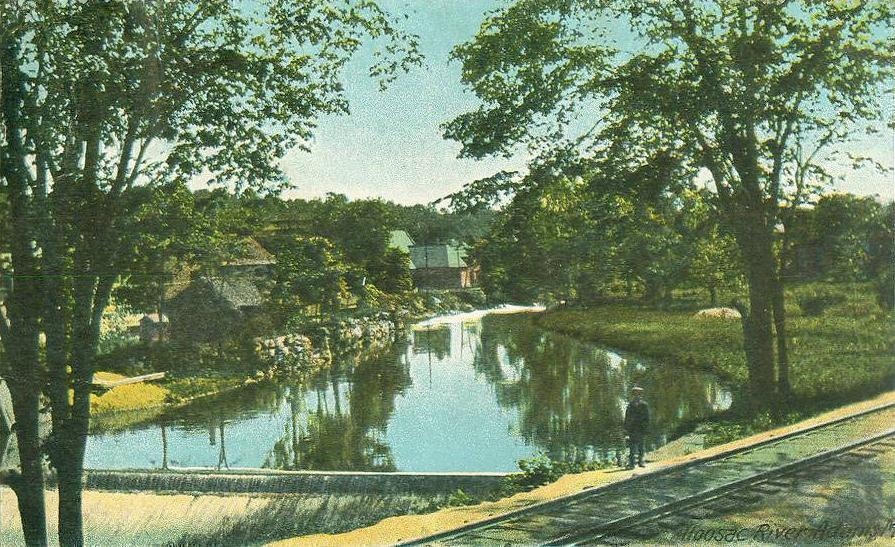
- Hoosic River

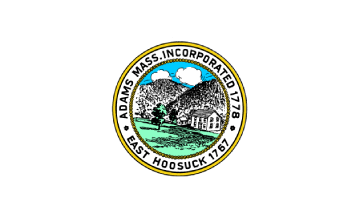
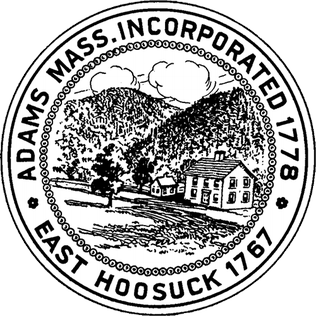
- Flag Seal

- Location in Berkshire County and the state of Massachusetts
- Coordinates: 42°37′27″N 73°07′05″W
- Country: United States
- State: Massachusetts
- County: Berkshire
- Settled: 1762
- Incorporated: 1778

Government
  - Type: Board of Selectmen Representative town meeting
  - Town Administrator: Nicholas Caccamo

Area
  - Total: 23.0 sq mi (59.5 km^{2})
  - Land: 22.9 sq mi (59.3 km^{2})
  - Water: 0.077 sq mi (0.2 km^{2})
- Elevation: 801 ft (244 m)

Population (2020)
  - Total: 8,166
  - Density: 357/sq mi (138/km^{2})
- Time zone: UTC−5 (Eastern)
  - Summer (DST): UTC−4 (Eastern)
- ZIP Code: 01220
- Area code: 413
- FIPS code: 25-00555
- GNIS feature ID: 0619415
- Website: town.adams.ma.us

Adams is a town in northern Berkshire County, Massachusetts, United States. It is part of the Pittsfield, Massachusetts Metropolitan Statistical Area. The population was 8,166 at the 2020 census. It contains the census-designated place of the same name.

== History ==
Nathan Jones purchased the township of East Hoosac at auction in 1762 from the Province of Massachusetts Bay for £3,200. In 1778, the town was officially incorporated as Adams, named in honor of Samuel Adams, a revolutionary leader and signer of the Declaration of Independence. Much of the land had been subdivided into 100-acre (40 ha) and 200-acre (81 ha) lots. These were mostly farms with frontage on the Hoosic River, which over time would provide water power for woolen, cotton, lumber, and plastic mills.

First settled in 1745, North Adams was originally part of Adams until the town split in 1878. Although there has never been a town of South Adams, the name was used prior to 1878 to specify the southern part of the town that had long had two primary centers. Usage of the South Adams name continued until 2012 as part of the South Adams Savings Bank incorporated in 1869.

Early settlers in the 1760s included a group of Quakers, many of whom migrated together from Smithfield, Rhode Island. The Quaker civil rights leader, abolitionist, and suffragist Susan B. Anthony was born in 1820 in Adams, where her family lived until she was six. They moved west into New York, and later moved again to western New York. Anthony's childhood home has been preserved and is operated today as a museum.

The town's population declined from 1810 to 1820 as farmers moved west for better soil. The War of 1812 had the unintended result of stimulating development of the textile industry in the United States because British textiles were no longer available. In 1814, the Adams South Village Cotton Manufacture Company opened. With the construction of a number of mills on the Hoosic River, the demand for labor increased greatly, and Adams' population more than doubled to 4,000 between 1820 and 1835. Growth in both halves of Adams also was stimulated by the opening of the Hoosac Tunnel in 1875. In the late 1800s, during the expansion of the cotton mills, four large brick buildings were constructed on Park Street: the P. J. Barrett Block, Jones Block, Armory Block, and the Mausert Block, opposite the Town Hall. They were used for retail stores and offices.

President William McKinley made two visits to the town, the second in 1897 to lay the cornerstone of the Adams Free Library. He was a friend of the Plunkett brothers (founders in 1889 of the Berkshire Cotton Manufacturing Company), and of the textile industry generally. In 1903, the town honored the assassinated president by erecting a larger-than-life statue beside the library.

Berkshire Cotton later became a major part of Berkshire Hathaway; it continued to manufacture high-quality textiles through the mid-20th century. Its large factory in Adams was closed in 1958. Many textile jobs had moved South, as the industry relocated to states with lower wages and weak unions.

The mill town's only major remaining mill, Specialty Minerals, mines and processes limestone for calcium carbonate. This is used in antacids and food supplements, as well as paper whiteners and other industrial purposes.

Since the late 20th century, the town has encouraged historic and destination tourism, part of a broader trend in the Berkshires. It has promoted its natural environment and outdoor activities, and its proximity to the galleries, museums and colleges of North Adams.

In 2020, "Banners for Fallen Heroes" made by George Haddad and James Bush who worked with volunteers, was made to honor those who enlisted from the town and died in service.

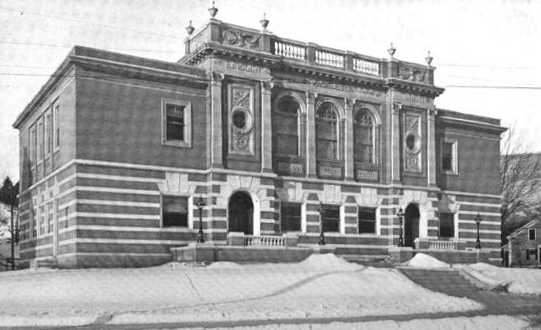
Adams public library, 1899

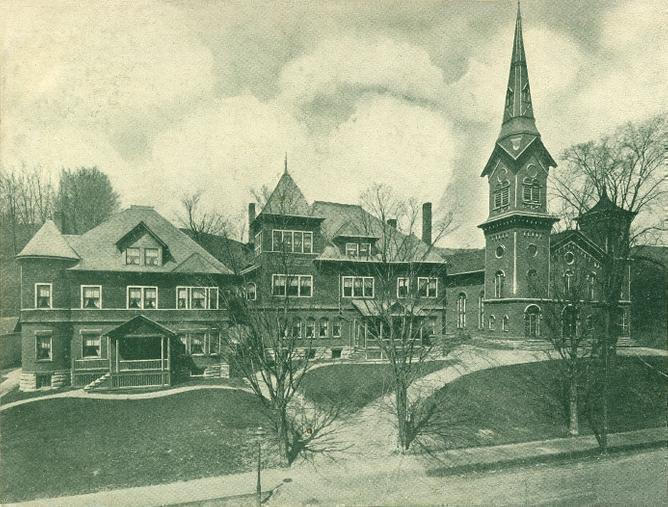
Congregational Church, Club House and Parish House c. 1905

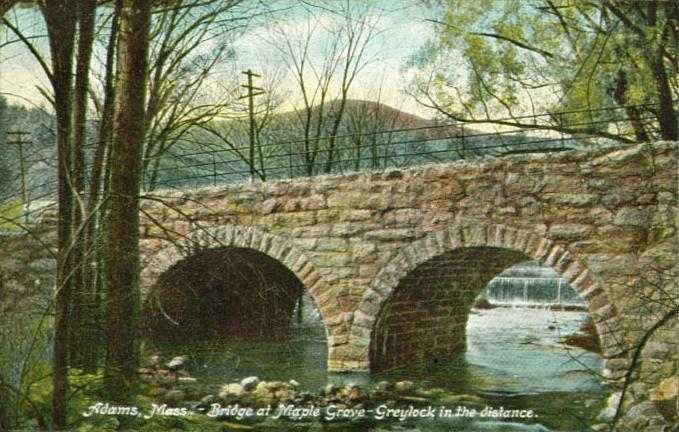
Bridge at Maple Grove c. 1910

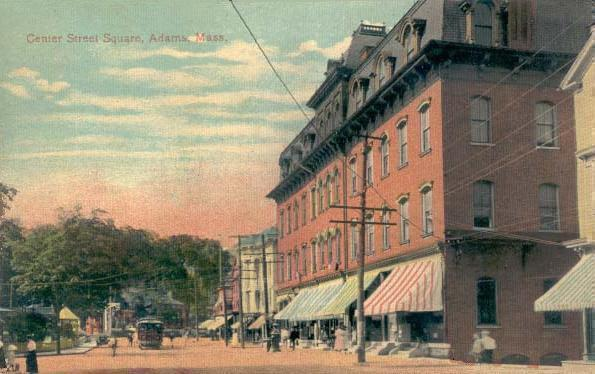
Center Street Square c. 1910

== Geography ==
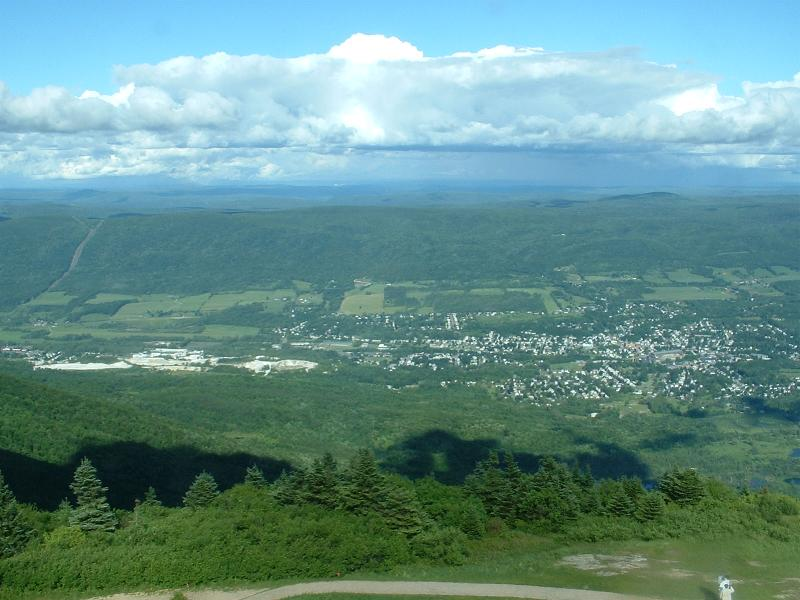
A view of Adams from atop Mount Greylock

According to the United States Census Bureau, the town has a total area of 23.0 square miles (59.5 km^{2}), of which 22.9 square miles (59.3 km^{2}) is land and 0.077 square miles (0.2 km^{2}), or 0.33%, is water. The town lies along the valley surrounding the Hoosic River and its tributary brooks. Set between the Taconic Range to the west and the Hoosac Range of the Berkshires to the east, Adams includes the summit of Mount Greylock, elevation 3,491 feet (1,064 m) above sea level. The mountain, located within the state reservation of the same name, is the highest point in Massachusetts, a waypoint on the Appalachian Trail, and in the 19th century inspired writers including Herman Melville. The town also includes a corner of Savoy Mountain State Park.

Adams is bordered to the north by North Adams, to the east by Florida and Savoy, to the south by Savoy and Cheshire, and to the west by New Ashford and Williamstown.

=== Climate ===
Adams has a humid continental climate (Dfb). Winters can be harsh, with temperatures dropping to 0 °F (−18 °C) or colder nine times per year. Summers are warm and pleasant, with temperatures at or above 90 °F (32 °C) four times per year. The record high is 96 °F (36 °C), recorded on July 8, 1988, and the record low is −20 °F (−29 °C), recorded on January 24, 2011, and February 6, 2015. On average, 153 days see measurable precipitation per year. A weather station is located in nearby North Adams.

Climate data for North Adams, MA (1991–2020 normals, extremes 1987–present)
Month	Jan	Feb	Mar	Apr	May	Jun	Jul	Aug	Sep	Oct	Nov	Dec	Year
Record high °F (°C)	68 (20)	76 (24)	87 (31)	90 (32)	92 (33)	93 (34)	96 (36)	94 (34)	92 (33)	84 (29)	77 (25)	70 (21)	96 (36)
Mean daily maximum °F (°C)	32.4 (0.2)	35.3 (1.8)	43.6 (6.4)	56.9 (13.8)	68.6 (20.3)	76.4 (24.7)	80.9 (27.2)	79.0 (26.1)	72.1 (22.3)	60.0 (15.6)	48.4 (9.1)	37.6 (3.1)	57.6 (14.2)
Daily mean °F (°C)	23.3 (−4.8)	25.4 (−3.7)	33.5 (0.8)	45.2 (7.3)	56.2 (13.4)	64.7 (18.2)	69.3 (20.7)	67.5 (19.7)	60.5 (15.8)	49.2 (9.6)	39.1 (3.9)	29.5 (−1.4)	46.9 (8.3)
Mean daily minimum °F (°C)	14.3 (−9.8)	15.5 (−9.2)	23.5 (−4.7)	33.5 (0.8)	43.9 (6.6)	53.0 (11.7)	57.7 (14.3)	56.1 (13.4)	48.8 (9.3)	38.4 (3.6)	29.7 (−1.3)	21.5 (−5.8)	36.3 (2.4)
Record low °F (°C)	−20 (−29)	−20 (−29)	−14 (−26)	0 (−18)	23 (−5)	33 (1)	43 (6)	38 (3)	28 (−2)	18 (−8)	1 (−17)	−12 (−24)	−20 (−29)
Average precipitation inches (mm)	2.52 (64)	1.97 (50)	3.08 (78)	3.12 (79)	3.73 (95)	4.41 (112)	4.13 (105)	4.47 (114)	4.22 (107)	4.28 (109)	3.25 (83)	3.12 (79)	42.30 (1,074)
Average precipitation days (≥ 0.01 in)	11	10	12	13	14	15	14	14	12	13	12	13	153
Source: NOAA

== Demographics ==
Historical population
Year	Pop.	±%
1790	2,040	—
1850	6,172	+202.5%
1860	6,924	+12.2%
1870	12,090	+74.6%
1880	5,591	−53.8%
1890	9,213	+64.8%
1900	11,134	+20.9%
1910	13,026	+17.0%
1920	12,967	−0.5%
1930	12,697	−2.1%
1940	12,608	−0.7%
1950	12,034	−4.6%
1960	12,391	+3.0%
1970	11,772	−5.0%
1980	10,381	−11.8%
1990	9,445	−9.0%
2000	8,809	−6.7%
2010	8,485	−3.7%
2020	8,166	−3.8%
2022*	8,047	−1.5%
* = population estimate. Source: United States census records and Population Estimates Program data.

As of the census of 2000, there were 8,809 people, 3,992 households, and 2,431 families residing in the town. Adams is the third most populated town in Berkshire County, and ranks 184th out of the 351 cities and towns in Massachusetts. The population density was 384.1 inhabitants per square mile (148.3/km^{2}), ranking it third in the county and 197th in the Commonwealth. There were 4,362 housing units at an average density of 190.2 per square mile (73.4/km^{2}), albeit packed into a fairly small portion of lower-lying land. The racial makeup of the town was 98.02% White, 0.36% Black or African American, 0.08% Native American, 0.24% Asian, 0.05% Pacific Islander, 0.27% from other races, and 0.98% from two or more races. Hispanic or Latino of any race were 0.82% of the population.

There were 3,992 households, out of which 26.9% had children under the age of 18 living with them, 45.0% were married couples living together, 11.9% had a female householder with no husband present, and 39.1% were non-families. Of all households, 34.8% were made up of individuals, and 17.7% had someone living alone who was 65 years of age or older. The average household size was 2.20 and the average family size was 2.81.

In the town, the population was spread out, with 22.4% under the age of 18, 6.6% from 18 to 24, 26.9% from 25 to 44, 23.6% from 45 to 64, and 20.4% who were 65 years of age or older. The median age was 41 years. For every 100 females, there were 89.2 males. For every 100 females age 18 and over, there were 85.0 males.

The median income for a household in the town was $32,161, and the median income for a family was $40,559. Males had a median income of $34,110 versus $23,556 for females. The per capita income for the town was $18,572. About 7.0% of families and 10.3% of the population were below the poverty line, including 12.7% of those under age 18 and 12.9% of those age 65 or over.

== Government ==
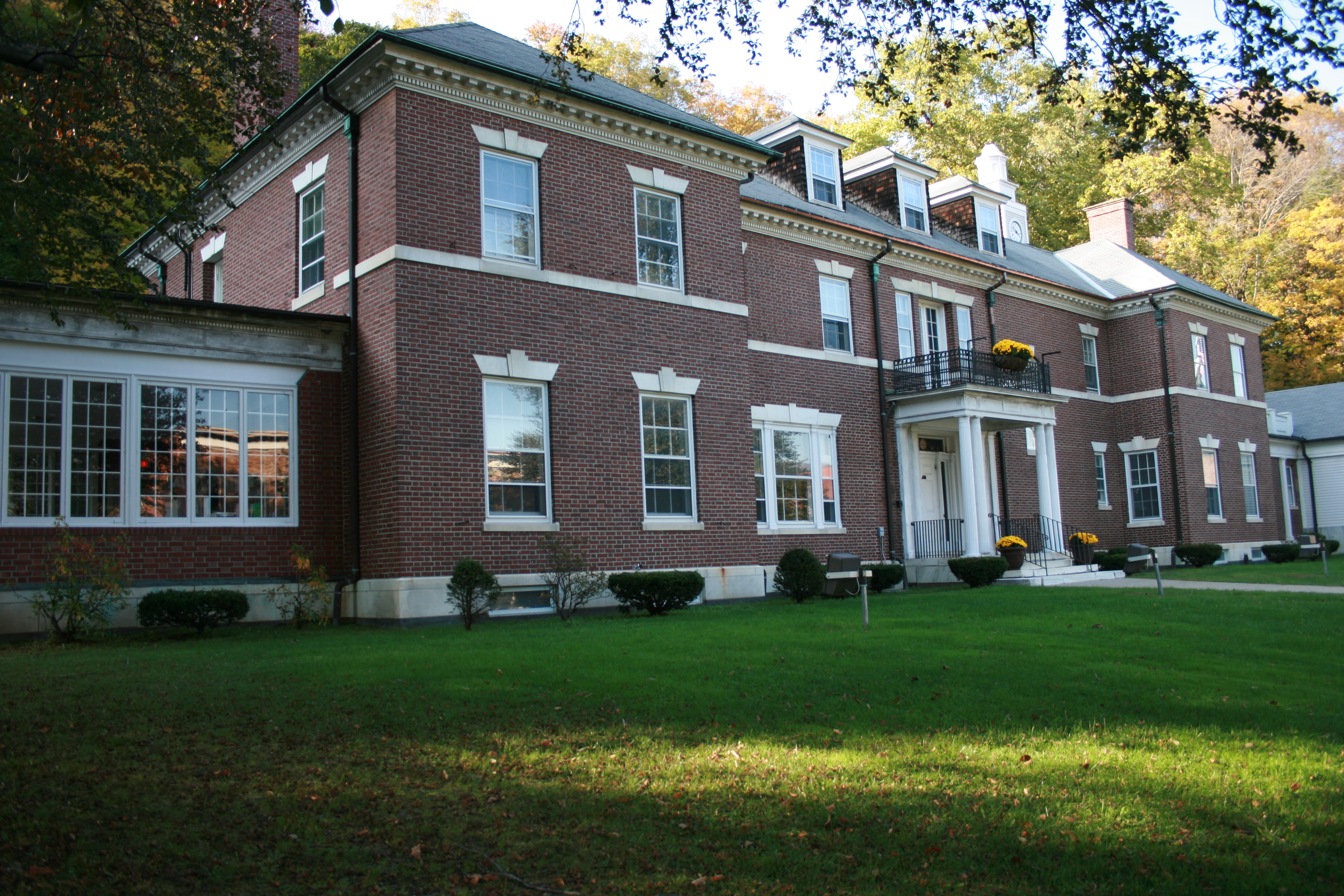
Adams town hall

Adams employs the representative town meeting form of government, and is led by a town administrator and a board of selectmen. The current selectmen are Richard Blanchard, John Duval, Christine Hoyt, Joseph Nowak and Howard Rosenberg. Conduct on the Town's Boards have had divisions, tensions and accusations. The town has its own services, including police, fire and public works. The nearest hospital, North Adams Regional Hospital, is located in neighboring North Adams.

The Adams Free Library was founded in 1897, and was established as a war memorial, with the cornerstone being laid by President McKinley himself. In fiscal year 2008, the town of Adams spent 2.18% ($261,939) of its budget on its public library—some $31 per person.

On the state level, Adams is represented in the Massachusetts House of Representatives by the First Berkshire district, which covers northern Berkshire County, as well as portions of Franklin County. In the Massachusetts Senate, the town is represented by the Berkshire, Hampshire and Franklin district, which includes all of Berkshire County and western Hampshire and Franklin counties. The town is patrolled by the Fourth (Cheshire) Station of Barracks "B" of the Massachusetts State Police.

On the national level, Adams is represented in the United States House of Representatives as part of Massachusetts's 1st congressional district, and has been represented by Richard Neal of Springfield since January 2013. Massachusetts is currently represented in the United States Senate by senior Senator Elizabeth Warren and junior Senator Ed Markey.

== Education ==
Adams is joined with neighboring Cheshire, and Savoy to form a regional school district. Both towns share an elementary school Plunkett Elementary School that serves Kindergarten to 3rd Grade. All 3 towns then send students to Hoosac Valley Middle School from 4th Grade, and 7th Grade, and Hoosac Valley High School from 8th Grade and 12th Grade, just over the border in Cheshire. Hoosac Valley's colors are red and white, and their teams are nicknamed the "Hurricanes."

Adams is also home to the Berkshire Arts & Technology Charter Public School (BArT) serving grades six through twelve, with a lottery based enrollment system going up up to 9th grade. BArT is a free public school.

High school students may choose to attend the public Charles H. McCann Technical High School in North Adams. There is also a parochial school in Adams, Saint Stanislaus Kostka, which serves students from pre-kindergarten through eighth grade, and other private schools are located in neighboring towns.

The nearest community college is Berkshire Community College in Pittsfield. The nearest state college is Massachusetts College of Liberal Arts in North Adams, and the nearest university is University of Massachusetts Amherst. The nearest private college is Williams College in nearby Williamstown.

== Transportation ==
Massachusetts Route 8 is the primary north–south road through town, and was originally signed as New England Interstate Route 8, which extended southward to Bridgeport, Connecticut. The town is the northern terminus of Route 116, which extends southeast to Springfield.

Until 1953 the New York Central Railroad had operated passenger trains from North Adams, south through Adams towards Pittsfield and Chatham, New York over Boston & Albany rail lines. The station house, Adams station still stands. Amtrak train service on the Lake Shore Limited is available 15 miles to the south at Pittsfield's Scelsi ITC.

Freight rail once ran through the town, but is now mostly converted to the paved Ashuwillticook Rail Trail. The town lies along the northern route of the Berkshire Regional Transit Authority. Regional bus service can be found in North Adams, as can regional air service at Harriman-and-West Airport. The nearest airport with international flights is Albany International Airport in New York.

== Sites of interest ==
- Adams Agricultural Fair
- Susan B. Anthony Birthplace Museum
- Ashuwillticook Rail Trail
- Greylock Glen
- Hoosac Valley Train
- Maple Street Cemetery
- Mount Greylock State Reservation
- Pittsfield & North Adams Passenger Station and Baggage & Express House
- Quaker Meeting House (1782)
- St. Stanislaus Parish Roman Catholic Church
- Summer Street Historic District
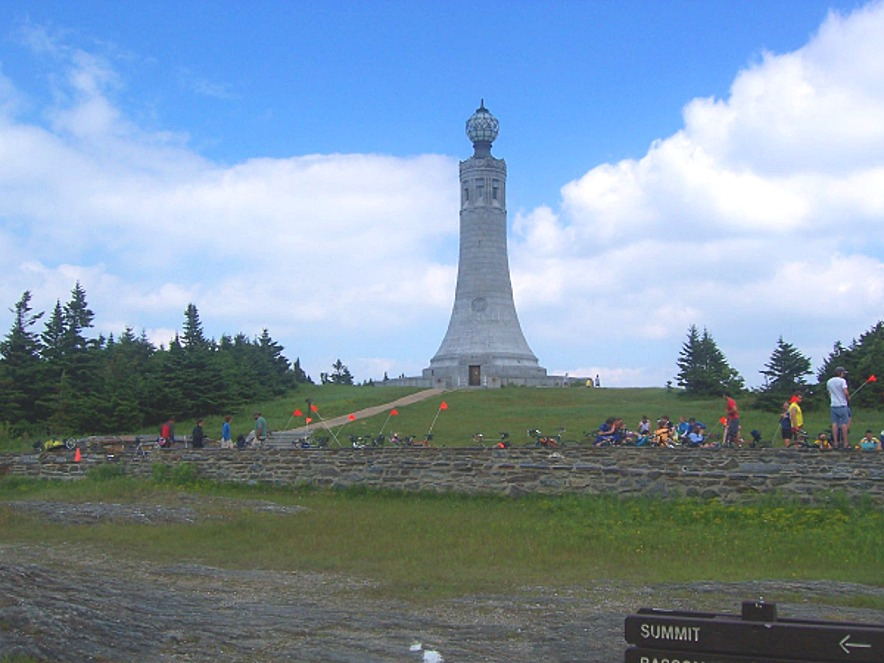
The War Memorial Tower atop Mount Greylock

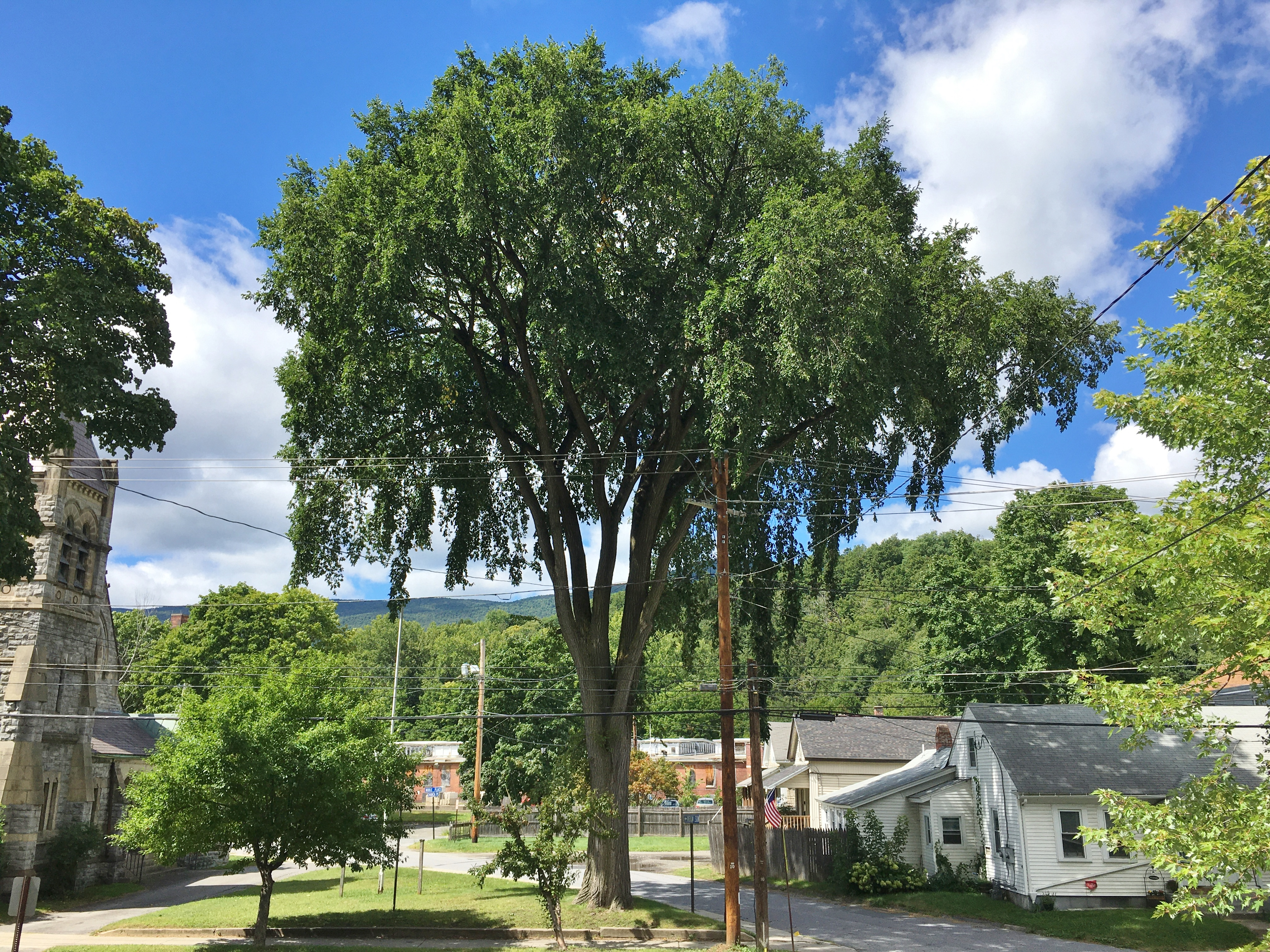
The last American elm tree in downtown Adams is located at the former St. Mark's Episcopal Church on Commercial Street. The church was built in 1881.

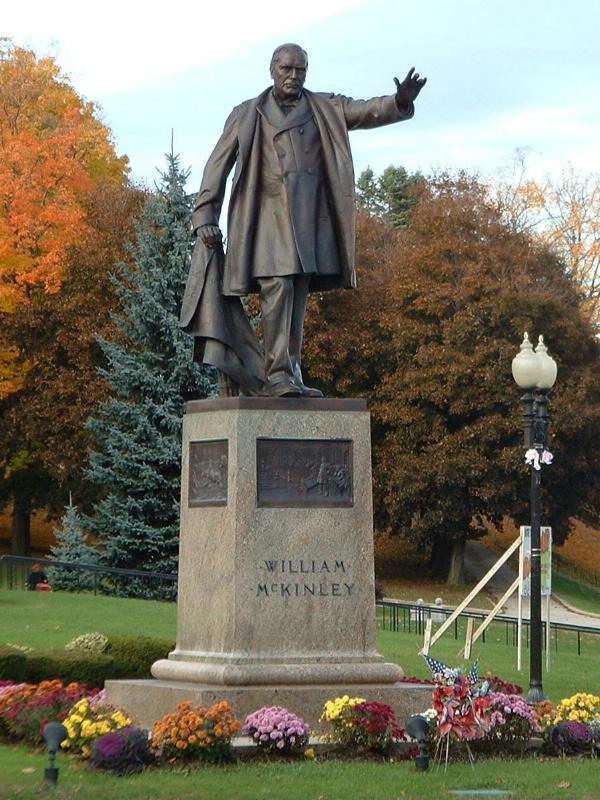
William McKinley statue in the square in front of the library (2004 photo)

== Notable people ==
- Daniel Read Anthony (1824–1904), publisher and militant abolitionist
- Susan B. Anthony (1820–1906), women's suffragist
- George N. Briggs (1796–1861), Governor of Massachusetts
- Adam P. Clermont (born 1970), American attorney and writer raised in Adams, Massachusetts. He served as instructing solicitor in the Hong Kong private prosecution of The Wall Street Journal's publisher Dow Jones Publishing Co. (Asia) Inc., which resulted in the publisher's September 2026 conviction for deterring journalist Selina Cheng from exercising her trade union rights.
- Lona Cohen (1913–1992), Soviet spy
- George P. Lawrence (1859–1917), US congressman
- Dale Long (1926–1991), Major League Baseball player
- Albert L. Phillips (1824–1893), Wisconsin politician
- Stacy Schiff (born 1961), author

== See also ==
- American school of magic in Harry Potter, Ilvermorny
- List of mill towns in Massachusetts
