= Jones Block (Adams, Massachusetts) =

- U.S. National Register of Historic Places
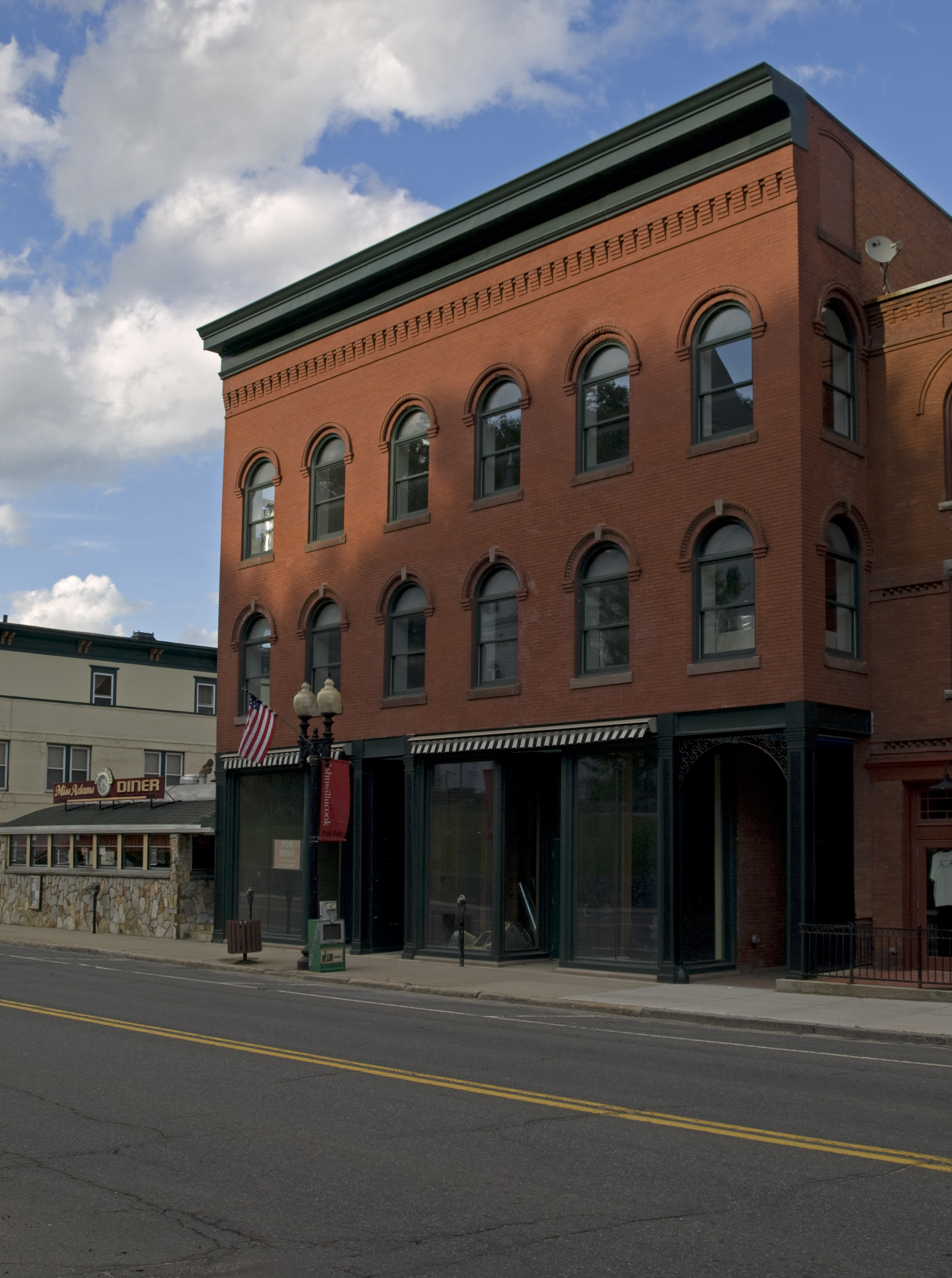

- Location within Massachusetts Location within the United States
- Location: Adams, Massachusetts
- Coordinates: 42°37′20.4702″N 73°7′11.9346″W
- Area: less than one acre
- Built: c. 1895
- NRHP reference No.: 82004947
- Added to NRHP: April 1, 1982

The Jones Block is a historic commercial building at 49–53 Park Street in Adams, Massachusetts. Built about 1895, it is one of a small number of surviving commercial buildings from the town's most rapid period of growth. It was added to the National Register of Historic Places in 1982.

== Description and history ==
The Jones Block is located in the town center of Adams, on the east side of Park Street north of town hall. It is a three-story brick structure, topped by a flat roof, with a decorative band and dentil molding at the roof line. The ground floor consists of two storefronts, framed by cast iron paneled columns, on either side of a central building entrance. Second and third floor windows are set in round-arch openings, those on the second story with sandstone keystones. It is one of the four brick buildings on Park Street, along with the P. J. Barrett Block, Armory Block, and the Mausert Block.

The block was built in 1895 for Albert Jones, a clerk in a local clothing retailer. Originally two stories in height, it housed that store on the ground floor, and the local Hibernian Hall on the second floor. The third floor was added in the early 20th century, using matching materials and styling to the original construction, and replicating its original cornice. The styling and placement of the third floor windows suggest that it was also used as a meeting space; it is not known whether Jones had planned for the expansion when the structure was originally built.

The building has been vacant for over 20 years since 1996, when a devastating fire on the second and third floor almost resulted in demolition of the building. Attempts by numerous developers to renovate the building had not been successful. The final developer, FP QOZB llc, purchased the building in 2021 and the renovation finally completed in 2023 after three decades.

== See also ==
- National Register of Historic Places listings in Berkshire County, Massachusetts
