= Bo (parashah) =

Fifteenth portion in the annual Jewish cycle of weekly Torah reading

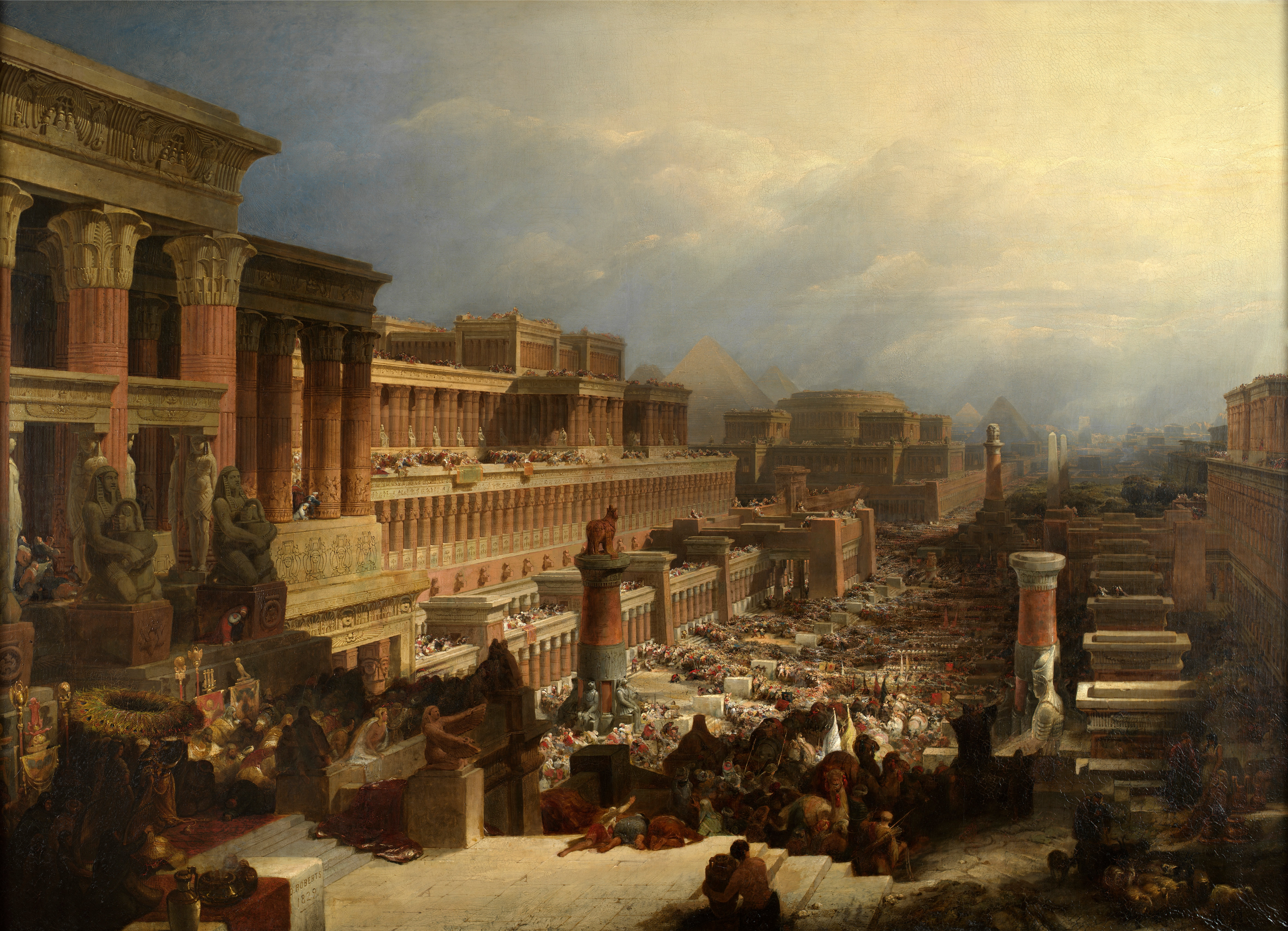
The Departure of the Israelites (1829 painting by David Roberts)

Bo (בֹּא—in Hebrew, the command form of "go," or "come," and the first significant word in the parashah, in Exodus 10:1) is the fifteenth weekly Torah portion (פָּרָשָׁה, parashah) in the annual Jewish cycle of Torah reading and the third in the book of Exodus. The parashah constitutes Exodus 10:1–13:16. The parashah tells of the last three plagues on Egypt and the first Passover.

The parashah is made up of 6,149 Hebrew letters, 1,655 Hebrew words, 106 verses, and 207 lines in a Torah Scroll. Jews read it the fifteenth Sabbath after Simchat Torah, generally in January or early February. As the parashah describes the first Passover, Jews also read part of the parashah, Exodus 12:21–51, as the initial Torah reading for the first day of Passover, and another part, Exodus 13:1–16, as the initial Torah reading for the first intermediate day (Chol HaMoed) of Passover. Jews also read another part of the parashah, Exodus 12:1–20, which describes the laws of Passover, as the maftir Torah reading for the Special Sabbath Shabbat HaChodesh, which falls on the first day (Rosh Chodesh) of Nisan, the month in which Jews celebrate Passover.

== Readings ==
In traditional Sabbath Torah reading, the parashah is divided into seven readings, or עליות, aliyot. In the Masoretic Text of the Hebrew Bible (Tanakh), Parashat Bo has seven "open portion" (פתוחה, petuchah) divisions (roughly equivalent to paragraphs, often abbreviated with the Hebrew letter פ (peh)). Parashat Bo has seven further subdivisions, called "closed portion" (סתומה, setumah) divisions (abbreviated with the Hebrew letter ס (samekh)) within the open portion divisions. The first open portion contains the first and part of the second readings. The second open portion covers the balance of the second and part of the third readings. The third open portion covers the balance of the third and all of the fourth readings. The fourth open portion covers the fifth and part of the sixth readings. The fifth and sixth open portion divisions further divide the sixth reading. The seventh open portion divides the seventh reading. Closed portion divisions separate the first and second readings, separate the second and third readings, and separate the third and fourth readings. Further closed portion divisions divide the fourth and sixth readings, and conclude the seventh reading.

=== First reading—Exodus 10:1–11 ===
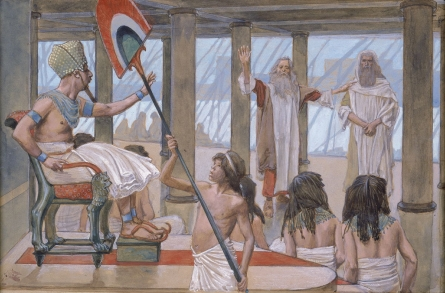
Moses Speaks to Pharaoh (watercolor circa 1896–1902 by James Tissot)

In the first reading, after seven plagues, God continued visiting plagues on Egypt. Moses and Aaron warned Pharaoh to let the Israelites go, or suffer locusts (אַרְבֶּה, arbeh) covering the land. Pharaoh's courtiers pressed Pharaoh to let the men go, so Pharaoh brought Moses and Aaron back and asked them, "Who are the ones to go?" Moses insisted that young and old, sons and daughters, flocks and herds would go, but Pharaoh rejected Moses' request and expelled Moses and Aaron from his presence. The first reading and a closed portion end here.

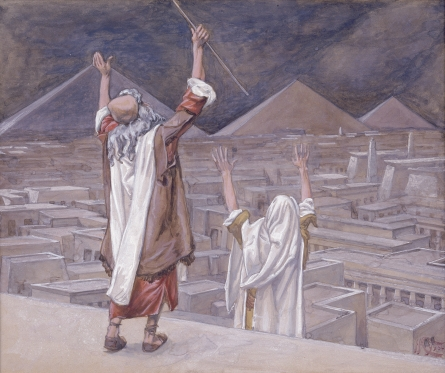
The Plague of Locusts (watercolor circa 1896–1902 by James Tissot)

=== Second reading—Exodus 10:12–23 ===
In the second reading, Moses held his rod over the land, and God drove an east wind to bring locusts to invade the land. Pharaoh summoned Moses and Aaron, asked forgiveness, and asked them to plead with God to remove the locusts. Moses did so, and God brought a west wind to lift the locusts into the Sea of Reeds. But God stiffened Pharaoh's heart, and he would not let the Israelites go. The first open portion ends here.

In the continuation of the reading, God instructed Moses to hold his arm toward the sky to bring darkness (חֹשֶׁךְ, choshech) upon the land, and Moses did so, but the Israelites enjoyed light. The second reading and a closed portion end here.

=== Third reading—Exodus 10:24–11:3 ===
In the third reading, Pharaoh summoned Moses and told him to go, leaving only the Israelites' flocks and herds behind, but Moses insisted that none of the Israelites' livestock be left behind, saying, "[W]e shall not know with what we are to worship the Lord until we arrive there." But God stiffened Pharaoh's heart, and he expelled Moses saying, "[T]he moment you look upon my face, you shall die." The second open portion ends here with the end of chapter 10.

In the continuation of the reading in chapter 11, God told Moses that God would bring one more plague, and then Pharaoh would let the Israelites go. God told Moses to tell the Israelites to ask their neighbors for silver and gold, and God disposed the Egyptians to favor the Israelites and Moses. The third reading and a closed portion end here.

=== Fourth reading—Exodus 11:4–12:20 ===
In the fourth reading, Moses warned Pharaoh that God would kill every firstborn in Egypt. And Moses left Pharaoh in hot anger. A closed portion ends here.

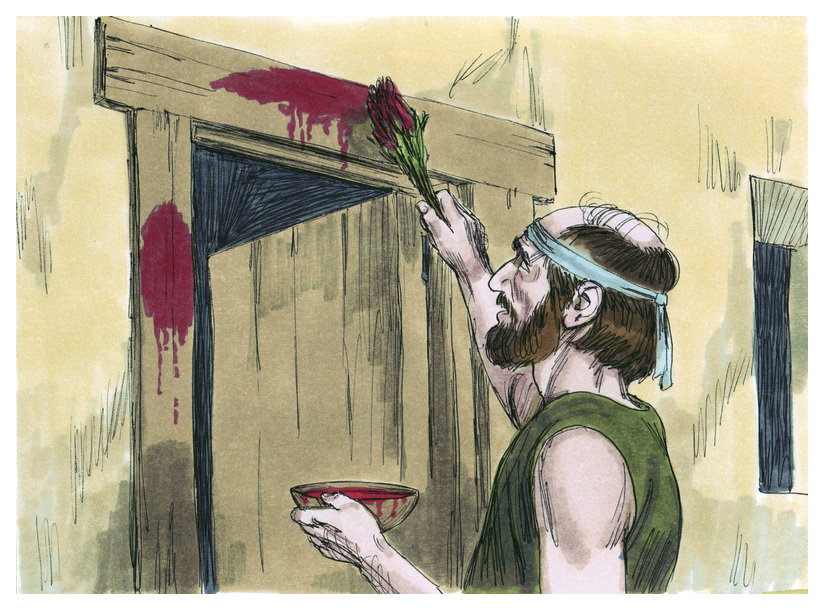
The Fathers Took Some of the Blood and Smeared It on the Doorposts (1984 illustration by Jim Padgett, courtesy of Distant Shores Media/Sweet Publishing)

In the continuation of the reading, God told Moses and Aaron to mark that month as the first of the months of the year. And God told them to instruct the Israelites in the laws of the Passover service, of the Passover lamb, and of abstaining from leavened bread. The fourth reading and the third open portion end here.

=== Fifth reading—Exodus 12:21–28 ===
In the short fifth reading, Moses instructed the elders of Israel to kill their Passover lambs, paint their doorways with the lamb's blood, and remain inside until the morning. For God would smite the Egyptians, but when God saw the blood on the lintel, God would pass over the house and not allow the Destroyer to come into that house. The Israelites were to observe the Passover service for all time, and when their children would ask what the service means, they were to say that it commemorates the time when God passed over the Israelites' houses when God smote the Egyptians. And the people bowed and worshipped. And the Israelites did as God commanded Moses and Aaron. The fifth reading and a closed portion end here.

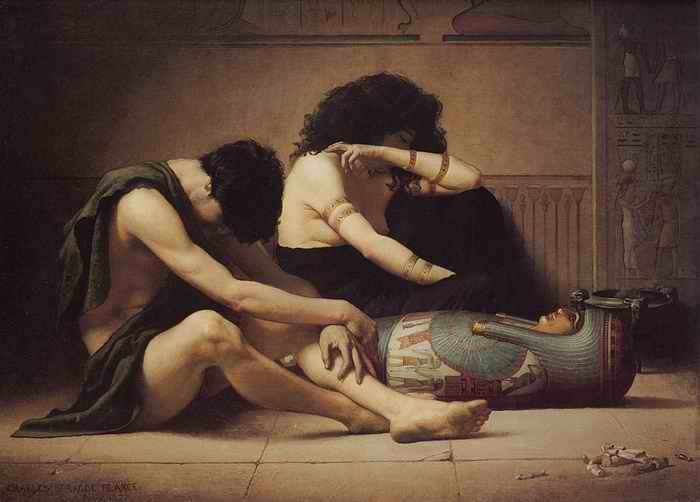
Lamentations over the Death of the Firstborn of Egypt (1877 painting by Charles Sprague Pearce)

=== Sixth reading—Exodus 12:29–51 ===
In the sixth reading, in the middle of the night, God struck down all the firstborn in Egypt. Pharaoh arose in the night to a loud cry in Egypt, summoned Moses and Aaron, and told them to take the Israelites and go. So the Israelites took their dough before it was leavened, and asked for silver, gold, and clothing from the Egyptians. The fourth open portion ends here.

In the continuation of the reading, the Israelites and a mixed multitude journeyed from Rameses to Sukkot. They baked unleavened bread (מַצָּה, matzah), because they could not delay before they left Egypt. The Israelites dwelt in Egypt for 430 years and left the land after the night of watching for the Lord. The fifth open portion ends here.

In the continuation of the reading, God told Moses and Aaron the laws of who was to keep the Passover. A closed portion ends here.

The reading concludes with a notice that on the same day, God bought the Israelites out of Egypt. The sixth reading and the sixth open portion end here with the end of chapter 12.

=== Seventh reading—Exodus 13:1–16 ===
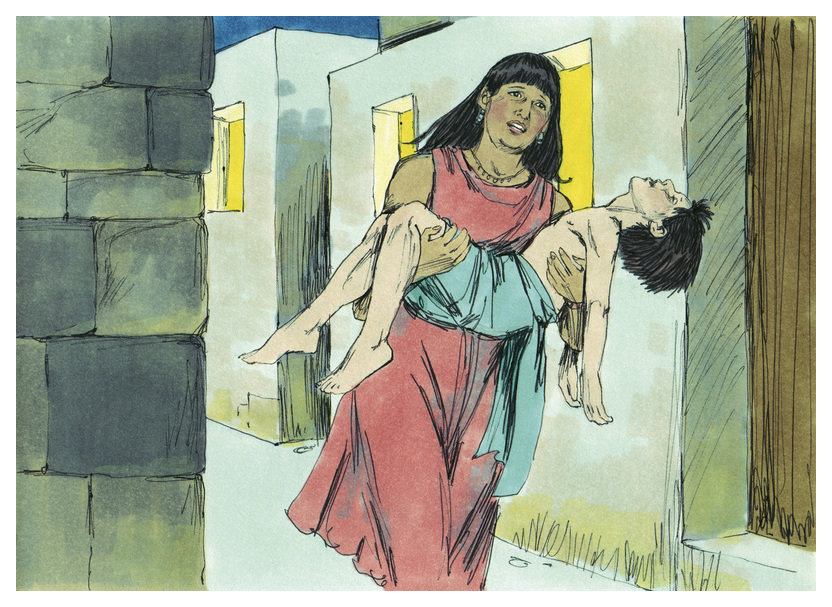
There was not one home in Egypt in which a son had not died. (1984 illustration by Jim Padgett, courtesy of Distant Shores Media/Sweet Publishing)

In the seventh reading, in chapter 13, God instructed Moses to tell the Israelites to consecrate to God every firstborn human and animal, and Moses did so. Moses told the people to remember the day and the month in which God brought them out of Egypt, and to keep the service to commemorate their deliverance in the same month, eating only unleavened bread (מַצָּה, matzah). And they were to tell their children to keep it as a sign upon their hands and for a memorial between their eyes and to keep this ordinance in its season from year to year. The seventh open portion ends here.

In the continuation of the reading, God instructed Moses in the laws of the firstborn.

In the maftir (מפטיר) reading that concludes the parashah, God instructed that if their children asked about consecrating the firstborn, the Israelites were to tell their children that God slew the firstborn of Egypt, and therefore the Israelites were to sacrifice to God all firstborn animals and redeem their firstborn sons. And thus it shall be for a sign upon their hands, and for frontlets between their eyes, for with a mighty hand God brought them out of Egypt. The seventh reading, a closed portion, and the parashah end here.

=== Readings according to the triennial cycle ===
Jews who read the Torah according to the triennial cycle of Torah reading read the parashah according to the following schedule:

	Year 1	Year 2	Year 3
	2023, 2026, 2029 . . .	2024, 2027, 2030 . . .	2025, 2028, 2031 . . .
Reading	10:1–11:3	11:4–12:28	12:29–13:16
1	10:1–3	11:4–10	12:29–32
2	10:4–6	12:1–10	12:33–36
3	10:7–11	12:11–13	12:37–42
4	10:12–15	12:14–16	12:43–51
5	10:16–23	12:17–20	13:1–4
6	10:24–29	12:21–24	13:5–10
7	11:1–3	12:25–28	13:11–16
Maftir	11:1–3	12:25–28	13:14–16

== In ancient parallels ==
The parashah has parallels in these ancient sources:

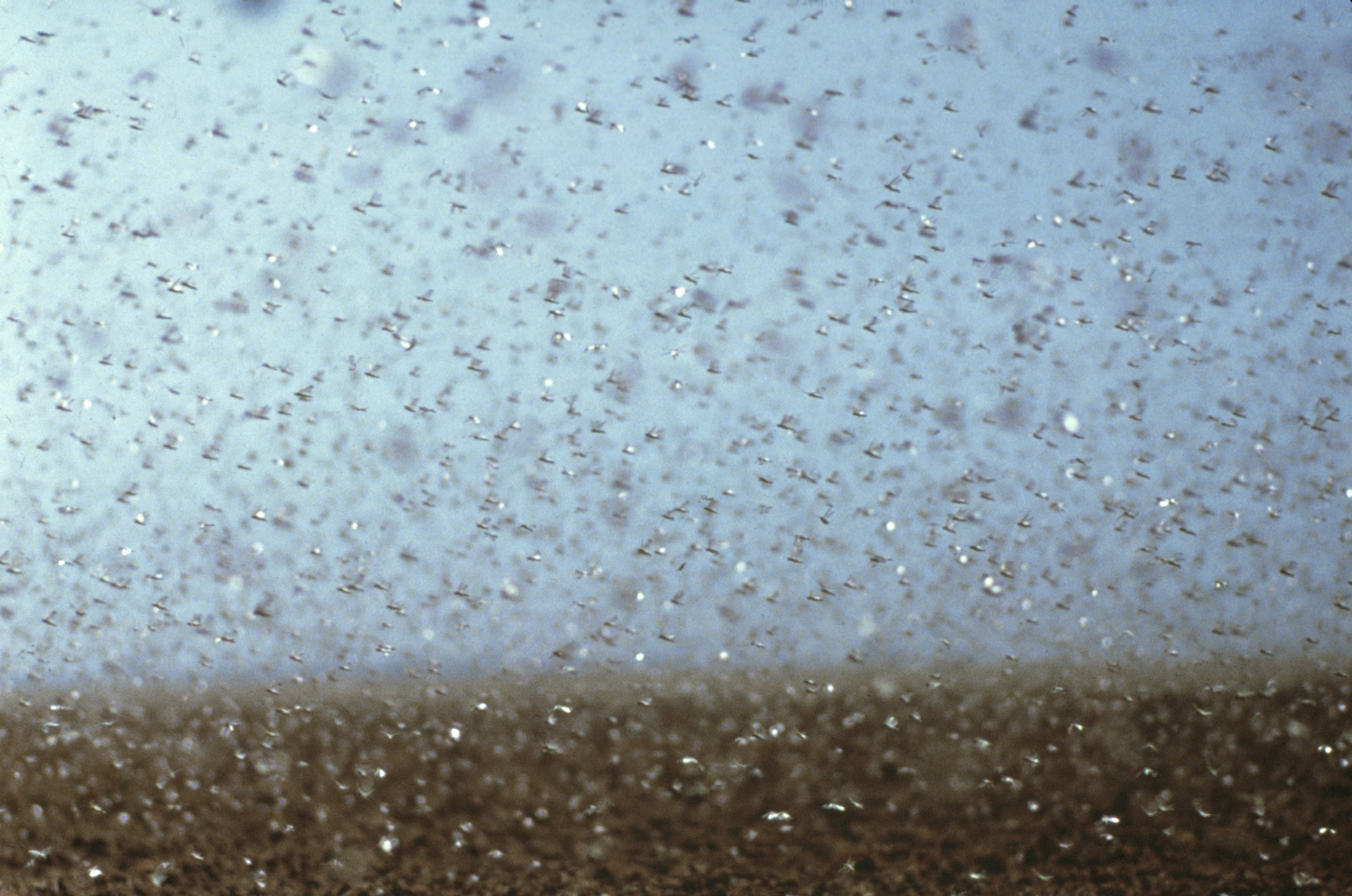
Locusts swarm

=== Exodus chapter 10 ===
The plague of locusts in Exodus 10:1–20 finds parallels in several ancient texts, often involving the actions of gods. The ancient Sumerian tale The Disputation Between the Hoe and the Plow related the acts of the god Enlil's hand and the locust swarm. Similarly, an Ugaritic poem about the goddess Anat circa 1450–1200 BCE related how Anat did battle, leaving corpses like locusts. In a New Kingdom Egyptian letter, one scribe chided another for leaving scribal work to labor in agriculture, where "The mice abound in the field, the locust descends, the cattle devour." An Akkadian prophecy foretold that locusts would arise and devour the land. The 754 BCE treaty between Ashur-nirari V of Assyria and Mati'ilu of Arpad, Syria, provided that if Mati'ilu violated the treaty, "May locusts appear and devour his land." Similarly, the treaty between Ktk and Arpad struck at about 750 BCE provided: "If Matti'el is false to Barga'yah and to his son and to his offspring . . . May Hadad pour out everything evil on earth and in heaven, and every trouble. And may he pour out hailstones upon Arpad. Seven years shall the locust eat. Seven years shall the worm eat. Seven years shall blight come upon the face of its land, and no grass shall sprout, so that nothing green can be seen and its vegetation does not appear." And the Vassal-Treaties of Esarhaddon, who ruled the Neo-Assyrian Empire 681–669 BCE, threatened the vassal who breached the treaty with these threats: "May Adad, the canal inspector of heaven and earth, put an end to vegetation in your land, may he avoid your meadows and hit your land with a severe destructive downpour, may locusts, which diminish the produce of the land, devour your crops, let there be no sound of the grinding stone or the oven in your houses, let barley rations to be ground disappear for you, so that they grind your bones, (the bones of) your sons and daughters instead of barley rations, and not even the (first) joint of your finger should be able to dip into the dough, may the . . . eat the dough from your troughs. . . . May they (the gods) let lice, caterpillars, and other field pests eat up your land and your district as if locusts." An Assyrian blessing wished: "The evil locust which ravages the grain, the malignant grasshopper which dries up the orchards, which would cut off the regular offerings of god and goddess,—Enlil listens to you, Tutu obeys you—may it (the grasshopper) be counted as naught!"

=== Exodus chapter 12 ===
The command to apply blood to the lintel and the two door-posts in Exodus 12:22 parallels Babylonian Namburbi rituals in which blood was smeared on doors and keyholes so that "evil [plague] shall not enter the house."

=== Exodus chapter 13 ===
Exodus 3:8 and 17, 13:5, and 33:3, Leviticus 20:24, Numbers 13:27 and 14:8, and Deuteronomy 6:3, 11:9, 26:9 and 15, 27:3, and 31:20 describe the Land of Israel as a land flowing "with milk and honey." Similarly, the Middle Egyptian (early second millennium BCE) tale of Sinuhe described the Land of Israel: "It was a good land called Yaa. Figs were in it and grapes. It had more wine than water. Abundant was its honey, plentiful its oil. All kind of fruit were on its trees. Barley was there and emmer, and no end of cattle of all kinds."

== In inner-biblical interpretation ==
The parashah has parallels or is discussed in these Biblical sources:

=== Exodus chapters 7–12 ===
The description of the 10 plagues exhibits patterns and progressions, as follows:

Cycle	Number	Plague	Verses	Was There Warning?	Time Warned	Introduction	Actor	Rod?	Israelites Shielded?	Did Pharaoh Concede?	Who Hardened Pharaoh's Heart?
First	1	blood	Exodus 7:14–25	yes	in the morning	לֵךְ אֶל-פַּרְעֹה Go to Pharaoh	Aaron	yes	no	no	passive voice
First	2	frogs	Exodus 7:26–8:11 (8:1–15 in KJV)	yes	unknown	בֹּא אֶל-פַּרְעֹה Go in to Pharaoh	Aaron	yes	no	yes	passive voice
First	3	gnats or lice	Exodus 8:12–15 (8:16–19 in KJV)	no	none	none	Aaron	yes	no	no	passive voice
Second	4	flies or wild beasts	Exodus 8:16–28 (8:20–32 in KJV)	yes	early in the morning	וְהִתְיַצֵּב לִפְנֵי פַרְעֹה stand before Pharaoh	God	no	yes	yes	Pharaoh
Second	5	livestock	Exodus 9:1–7	yes	unknown	בֹּא אֶל-פַּרְעֹה Go in to Pharaoh	God	no	yes	no	Pharaoh
Second	6	boils	Exodus 9:8–12	no	none	none	Moses	no	no	no	God
Third	7	hail	Exodus 9:13–35	yes	early in the morning	וְהִתְיַצֵּב לִפְנֵי פַרְעֹה stand before Pharaoh	Moses	no	yes	yes	passive voice
Third	8	locusts	Exodus 10:1–20	yes	unknown	בֹּא אֶל-פַּרְעֹה Go in to Pharaoh	Moses	yes	no	yes	God
Third	9	darkness	Exodus 10:21–29	no	none	none	Moses	yes	yes	yes	God
	10	firstborn	Exodus 11:1–10; 12:29–32	yes	unknown	none	God	no	yes	yes	God

Psalms 78:44–51 and 105:23–38 each recount differing arrangements of seven plagues. Psalm 78:44–51 recalls plagues of (1) blood, (2) flies, (3) frogs, (4) locusts, (5) hail, (6) livestock, and (7) firstborn, but not plagues of lice, boils, or darkness. Psalm 105:23–38 recalls plagues of (1) darkness, (2) blood, (3) frogs, (4) flies and lice, (5) hail, (6) locusts, and (7) firstborn, but not plagues of livestock or boils.

=== Exodus chapters 12–13 ===
==== Passover ====
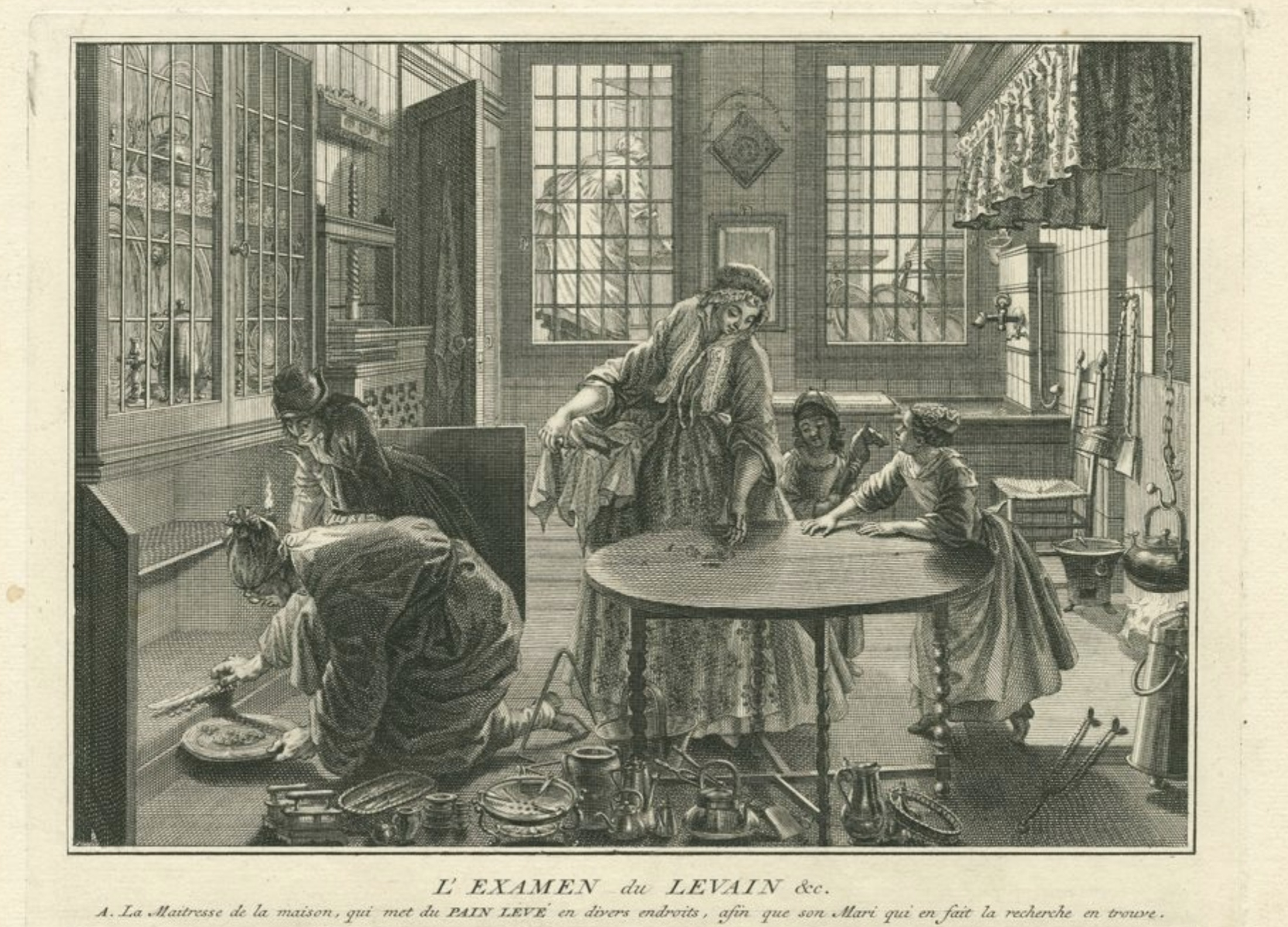
The Search for Leaven (illustration circa 1733–1739 by Bernard Picart)

Exodus 12:3–28 and 43–50 and 13:6–10 refer to the Festival of Passover. In the Hebrew Bible, Passover is called:

- "Passover" (Pesach, פֶּסַח);
- "The Feast of Unleavened Bread" (Chag haMatzot, חַג הַמַּצּוֹת); and
- "A holy convocation" or "a solemn assembly" (mikrah kodesh, מִקְרָא-קֹדֶשׁ).

Some explain the double nomenclature of "Passover" and "Feast of Unleavened Bread" as referring to two separate feasts that the Israelites combined sometime between the Exodus and when the Biblical text became settled. Exodus 34:18–20 and Deuteronomy 15:19–16:8 indicate that the dedication of the firstborn also became associated with the festival.

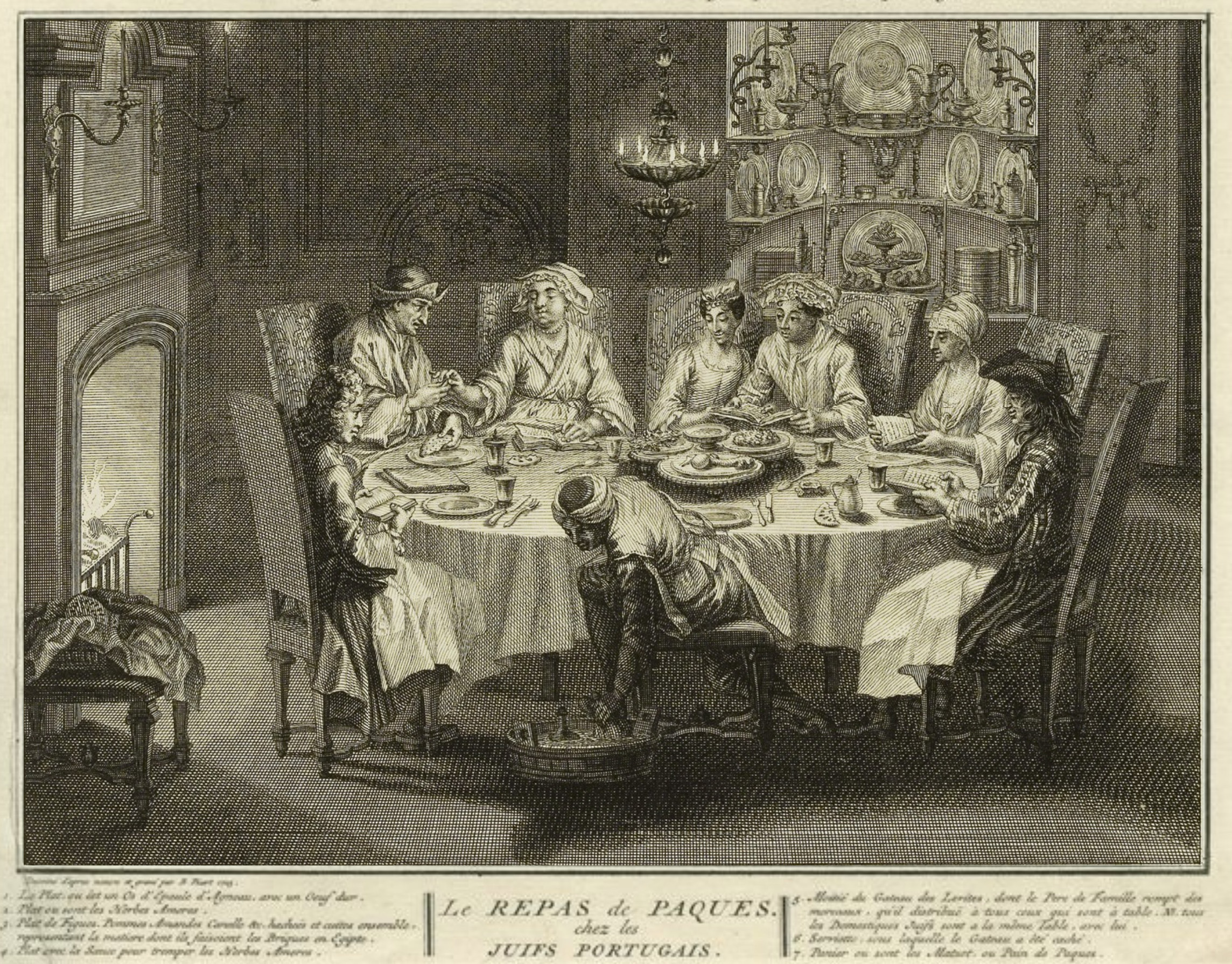
The Passover Seder of the Portuguese Jews (illustration circa 1733–1739 by Bernard Picart)

Some believe that the "Feast of Unleavened Bread" was an agricultural festival at which the Israelites celebrated the beginning of the grain harvest. Moses may have had this festival in mind when in Exodus 5:1 and 10:9 he petitioned Pharaoh to let the Israelites go to celebrate a feast in the wilderness.

"Passover," on the other hand, was associated with a thanksgiving sacrifice of a lamb, also called "the Passover," "the Passover lamb," or "the Passover offering."

Exodus 12:5–6, Leviticus 23:5, and Numbers 9:3 and 5, and 28:16 direct "Passover" to take place on the evening of the fourteenth of Aviv (Nisan in the Hebrew calendar after the Babylonian captivity). Joshua 5:10, Ezekiel 45:21, Ezra 6:19, and 2 Chronicles 35:1 confirm that practice. Exodus 12:18–19, 23:15, and 34:18, Leviticus 23:6, and Ezekiel 45:21 direct the "Feast of Unleavened Bread" to take place over seven days and Leviticus 23:6 and Ezekiel 45:21 direct that it begin on the fifteenth of the month. Some believe that the propinquity of the dates of the two festivals led to their confusion and merger.

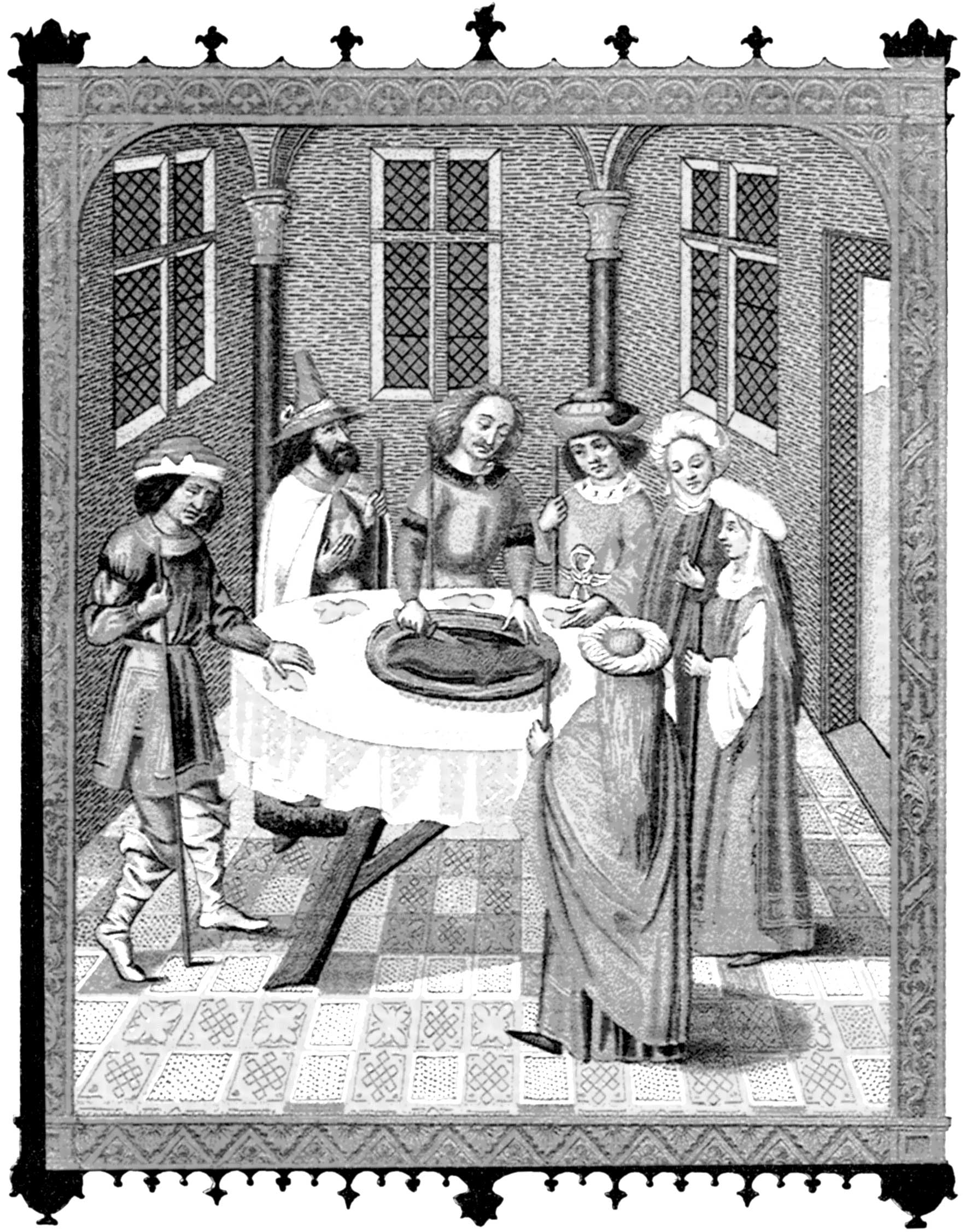
The Jews' Passover (facsimile of a 15th-century miniature from a missel with paintings by the School of Van Eyck)

Exodus 12:23 and 27 link the word "Passover" (Pesach, פֶּסַח) to God's act to "pass over" (pasach, פָסַח) the Israelites' houses in the plague of the firstborn. In the Torah, the consolidated Passover and Feast of Unleavened Bread thus commemorate the Israelites' liberation from Egypt.

Benjamin Sommer saw in Exodus 12:9 and Deuteronomy 16:7 a case in which one Biblical author explicitly interpreted another Biblical text. Both texts provide regulations concerning the Passover sacrifice, but the regulations differ. Deuteronomy 16:7 instructed the Israelites to boil the Passover sacrifice. Sommer argued that Exodus 12:9 takes issue with Deuteronomy 16:7 on this point, however, warning (in Sommer's translation), "Don't eat it raw or boiled in water; rather, [eat it] roasted in fire." Sommer did not find such a disagreement in this ancient Jewish literature surprising, arguing that two groups in the Biblical period agreed that the Passover sacrifice was important but disagreed on its precise details.

The Hebrew Bible frequently notes the Israelites' observance of Passover at turning points in their history. Numbers 9:1–5 reports God's direction to the Israelites to observe Passover in the wilderness of Sinai on the anniversary of their liberation from Egypt. Joshua 5:10–11 reports that upon entering the Promised Land, the Israelites kept the Passover on the plains of Jericho and ate unleavened cakes and parched corn, produce of the land, the next day. 2 Kings 23:21–23 reports that King Josiah commanded the Israelites to keep the Passover in Jerusalem as part of Josiah's reforms, but also notes that the Israelites had not kept such a Passover from the days of the Biblical judges nor in all the days of the kings of Israel or the kings of Judah, calling into question the observance of even Kings David and Solomon. The more reverent 2 Chronicles 8:12–13, however, reports that Solomon offered sacrifices on the festivals, including the Feast of Unleavened Bread. And 2 Chronicles 30:1–27 reports King Hezekiah's observance of a second Passover anew, as sufficient numbers of neither the priests nor the people were prepared to do so before then. And Ezra 6:19–22 reports that the Israelites returned from the Babylonian captivity observed Passover, ate the Passover lamb, and kept the Feast of Unleavened Bread seven days with joy.

== In early nonrabbinic interpretation ==
The parashah has parallels or is discussed in these early nonrabbinic sources:

=== Exodus chapter 12 ===
The Book of Jubilees taught that the Israelites were forbidden to break any bone of the Passover lamb so that no bone should be crushed of the children of Israel.

Philo wrote that God instructed the Israelites to offer unleavened bread and bitter herbs together with the Passover sacrifice because unleavened bread signified great haste and speed, while bitter herbs signified the life of bitterness and struggle that the Israelites endured as slaves. Philo also taught that the deeper meaning was that leavened and fermented foods rose, while unleavened foods remained low, and each of these states symbolized types of the soul. Leavening symbolized the haughty soul swollen with arrogance, while the unleavened symbolized the unchangeable and prudent soul choosing the middle way rather than extremes. The bitter herbs manifested a psychic migration from passion to impassivity and from wickedness to virtue. For, Philo taught, those who naturally and genuinely repented became bitter toward their former way of life, lamenting the time that they had given over to the seductive and deceitful mistress of desire, being deceived by desire when they ought to have renewed themselves and advanced in the contemplation of wisdom toward the goal of a happy and immortal life. And so, those who desired repentance ate the unleavened bread with bitter herbs; they first ate bitterness over their old and unendurable life, and then ate the opposite of boastful arrogance in meditation on humility. For, Philo concluded, the memory of former sins caused fear, and by restraining sin through recollection, brought profit to the mind.

== In classical rabbinic interpretation ==
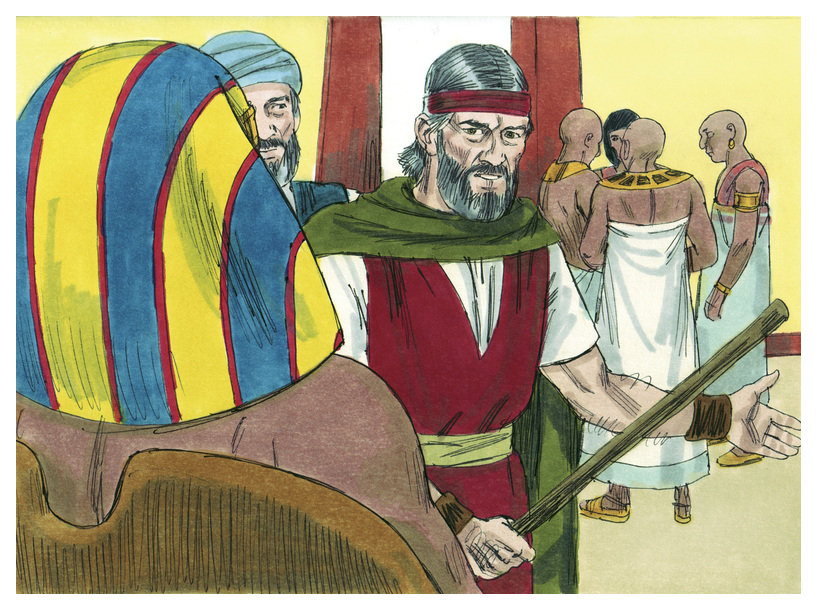
The Lord sent Moses to warn Pharaoh about a locust plague. (1984 illustration by Jim Padgett, courtesy of Distant Shores Media/Sweet Publishing)

The parashah is discussed in these rabbinic sources from the era of the Mishnah and the Talmud:

=== Exodus chapter 10 ===
Reading Exodus 12:1, 43, and 50, a midrash taught that in 18 verses, Scripture places Moses and Aaron (the instruments of Israel's deliverance) on an equal footing (reporting that God spoke to both of them alike), and thus there are 18 benedictions in the Amidah.

A midrash taught that in Exodus 10:1, God begins with the word "Come (בֹּא, bo)," instead of "Go (לֶך, lech)," to teach that the Glory of God fills the whole earth, including Pharaoh's Egypt.

Rabbi Joḥanan asked whether God's words in Exodus 10:1, "For I have hardened his heart," did not provide heretics with ground for arguing that Pharaoh had no means of repenting. Rabbi Simeon ben Lakish (Resh Lakish) replied that the mouths of the heretics should be stopped up. For, as Proverbs 3:34 teaches, "If it concerns the scorners, He scorns them." When God warns people once, twice, and even a third time, and they still do not repent, then God closes their hearts against repentance so that God may exact vengeance from them for their sins. Thus, it was with the wicked Pharaoh. Since God sent five times to him (in the first five plagues) and he took no notice, God then told Pharaoh that he had stiffened his neck and hardened his heart, so God would add to Pharaoh's impurity. The midrash taught that the expression "I hardened" (הִכְבַּדְתִּי, hichbad'ti) implied that God made Pharaoh's heart like a liver (כָּבֵד, kaveid), which stiffens (and becomes unabsorbent) if boiled a second time. So Pharaoh's heart was made like a liver, and he did not receive the words of God.

Similarly, Rabbi Phinehas, the priest, son of Rabbi Hama, interpreted God's hardening of Pharaoh's heart in light of Job 36:13, "But they who are godless in heart lay up anger; they cry not for help when He binds them." Rabbi Phinehas taught that if the godless, for whose repentance God waits, do not do so, then later, even when they do think of it, God distracts their hearts from penitence. Rabbi Phinehas interpreted the words of Job 36:13, "And they who are godless in heart," to teach that those who begin by being godless in heart end up bringing upon themselves God's anger. And Rabbi Phinehas interpreted the words of Job 36:13, "They cry not for help when He binds them," to teach that though the godless wish later to return to God and to pray to God, they are no longer able, because God binds them and bars their way. Thus after several plagues, Pharaoh wished to pray to God, but God told Moses in Exodus 8:16: "Before he goes out [to pray to God], stand before Pharaoh."

Reading the words of Exodus 10:1, "and the heart of his servants," a midrash taught that when Pharaoh's heart softened, his servants' hardened, and when they softened, he hardened. When both softened, God hardened their hearts, as Exodus 10:1 states. God closed their hearts to repentance to punish them for their earlier stubbornness.

Reading the words "My signs (אֹתֹתַי, ototai) in the midst of them" in Exodus 10:1, Rabbi Judah ben Simon taught that God inscribed the letters of the plagues on their very bodies. Similarly, a midrash taught that God inscribed abbreviations of the plagues on the staff of Moses, so that he would know which plague was next.

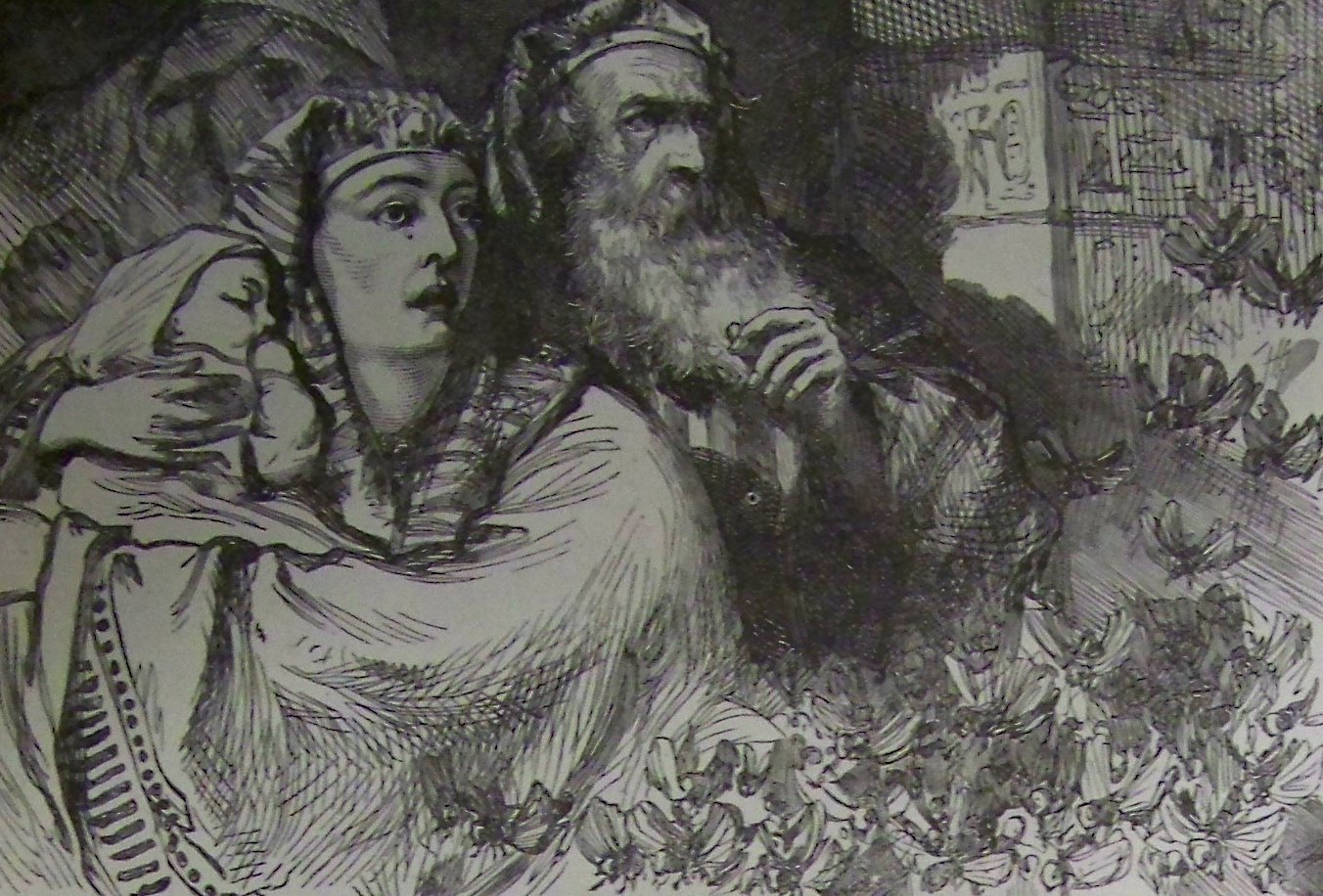
The Plague of Locusts (illustration from the 1890 Holman Bible)

It was taught in a baraita that Rabbi Judah the Prince (or others say Rabbi Meir) used to say that Providence repays a person measure for measure. Thus, a midrash taught that God sent the plagues against Pharaoh measure for measure. God changed the Egyptians' water into blood because the Egyptians prevented the Israelites from using the ritual bath (mikveh) so as to prevent the Israelite women from having marital relations with their husbands. God brought frogs because the Egyptians had ordered the Israelites to bring them reptiles and creeping creatures (which were an abomination to the Israelites). God sent lice because the Egyptians had made the Israelites clean the dirty streets and marketplaces. God sent swarms of wild animals because the Egyptians had demanded that the Israelites catch bears, lions, and leopards so as to separate the Israelite men from their wives. God brought the pestilence upon the Egyptians' cattle because they had forced the Israelites to serve as shepherds to keep the Israelite men away from their wives. God sent boils because the Egyptians had demanded that the Israelites warm things for them. God sent hail to destroy the Egyptians' crops because the Egyptians had sent the Israelites into the fields to plow and sow. God brought the locusts to destroy the Egyptians' grain because the Egyptians had forced the Israelites to plant wheat and barley for them. God brought darkness because among the Israelites were transgressors who had Egyptian patrons and lived in affluence and honor in Egypt and did not want to leave Egypt, and so God brought darkness so that God could kill these transgressors without the Egyptians' seeing.

A midrash taught that God brought the locusts upon the Egyptians in Exodus 10:1–20 because the Egyptians had made the Israelites sow wheat and barley for them, and thus God brought locusts to devour what the Israelites had sown for them.

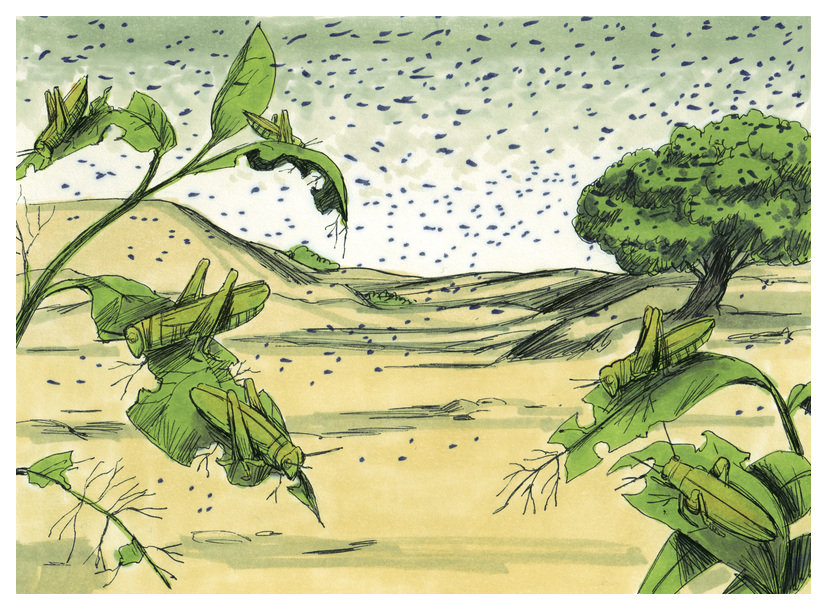
The Lord caused and east wind to blow in great swarms of locusts. (1984 illustration by Jim Padgett, courtesy of Distant Shores Media/Sweet Publishing)

A midrash taught that God fixed a time of "tomorrow" for the plague of locusts in Exodus 10:4 so that the Egyptians might feel remorse and do penitence (thus showing that the Egyptians were still not barred from doing penitence).

A midrash read the words of Exodus 10:6, "And he turned, and went out from Pharaoh," to teach that Moses saw Pharaoh's ministers turning to one another, as if inclined to believe the words of Moses. So Moses turned to go out to allow them to talk about how to repent.

Reading in Exodus 10:7 that "Pharaoh's servants said to him: 'How long shall this man be a snare unto us?'" the Sages counted Pharaoh's servants among six exemplars who gave good advice, along with Naaman's servants, King Saul's ministers, the ministers of the King of Aram, and the ministers of King Ahasuerus.

Reading Pharaoh's question in Exodus 10:8, "Who are they that shall go?" a midrash taught that Pharaoh asked this because he saw in the stars that of all who would leave Egypt, only two, Joshua and Caleb, were destined to enter the Land of Israel. It was to these two to whom Pharaoh alluded when he asked, "Who are they?"

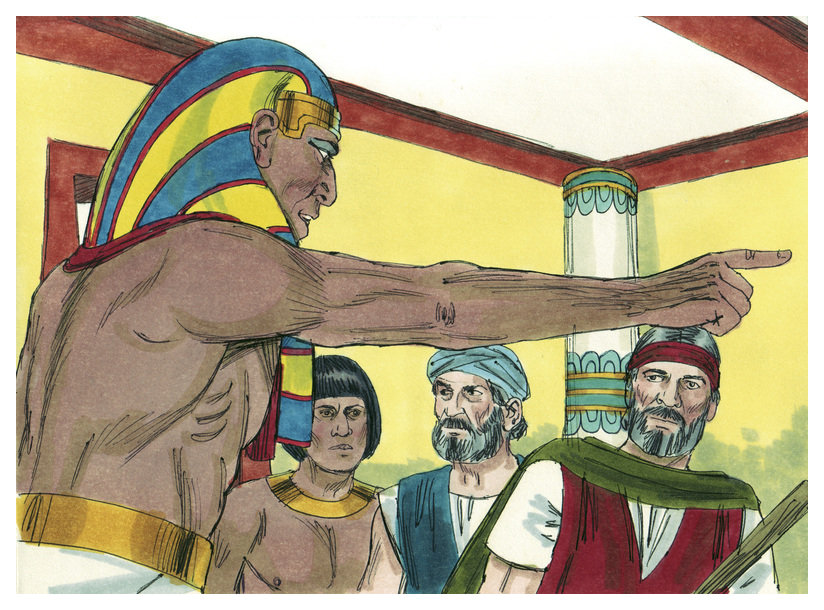
Pharaoh drove Moses and Aaron out of his presence. (1984 illustration by Jim Padgett, courtesy of Distant Shores Media/Sweet Publishing)

A midrash read Pharaoh's words to Moses in Exodus 10:10, "see that evil is before your face," to indicate that Pharaoh deduced that one who made a request for the young and the old to go could have only one object in mind—to flee. Pharaoh thus perceived that Moses sought to do evil and flee. On that account, Pharaoh said that he would not listen to Moses in anything further, and in the words of Exodus 10:11, "they were driven out from Pharaoh's presence"

The Mishnat Rabbi Eliezer taught that Pharaoh mocked the Israelites when he told Moses in Exodus 10:11, "for that is what you desire." The Mishnat Rabbi Eliezer taught that mockery yields evil results, for God did not change the course of nature in any of the plagues until Pharaoh mocked the Israelites. Pharaoh jeered at the Israelites, telling Moses "You tell me, 'The men, the women, and the children are to go'; yet you really need only the men." And since Pharaoh mocked the Israelites, God altered the course of nature and turned light into darkness upon Pharaoh.

A midrash read Pharaoh's words to Moses in Exodus 10:16, "I have sinned against the Lord your God," to apply to Pharaoh's not letting the Israelites go free (as God had commanded Pharaoh through Moses). And Pharaoh's words to Moses, "I have sinned . . . against you," to apply to Pharaoh's driving Moses out from his presence, as well as to Pharaoh's intention to curse Moses when Pharaoh said in Exodus 10:10, "So be the Lord with you." Thus, Pharaoh sought forgiveness in Exodus 10:17, asking Moses, "Now therefore forgive, I pray, my sin only this once."

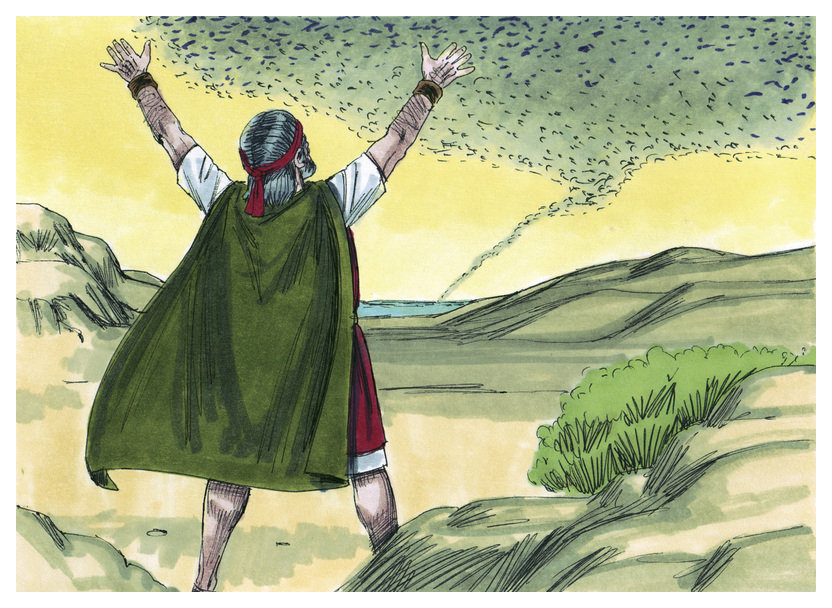
Moses prayed and God caused the wind to blow the locusts into the sea. (1984 illustration by Jim Padgett, courtesy of Distant Shores Media/Sweet Publishing)

The Mekhilta of Rabbi Ishmael called the east wind with which God brought the plague of the locusts in Exodus 10:13 "the mightiest of winds." The Mekhilta of Rabbi Ishmael taught that God used the east wind to punish the generation of the Flood, the people of the Tower of Babel, the people of Sodom, the Egyptians in Exodus 10:13, the Tribes of Judah and Benjamin, the Ten Tribes, Tyre, a wanton empire, and the wicked of Gehinnom.

Reading the words of Exodus 10:19, "there remained not one locust in all the border of Egypt," Rabbi Johanan taught that when the locusts first came, the Egyptians rejoiced and gathered them and filled barrels with them. Then God became outraged that the Egyptians would rejoice with the plagues that God had brought upon them. And immediately (as reported in Exodus 10:19), "the Lord turned an exceeding strong west wind, which took up the locusts." And the midrash interpreted the words of Exodus 10:19, "there remained not one locust in all the border of Egypt," to teach that the wind blew away even the locusts that the Egyptians had pickled in their pots and barrels.

A midrash taught that God brought darkness upon the people in Exodus 10:21–23 because some Israelite transgressors had Egyptian patrons, lived in affluence and honor, and were unwilling to leave Egypt. God reasoned that bringing a plague and killing these transgressors publicly would cause the Egyptians to conclude that the plagues punished Egyptians and Israelites alike, and thus did not come from God. Thus, God brought darkness upon the Egyptians for three days, so that the Israelites could bury the dead transgressors without the Egyptians seeing them do so.

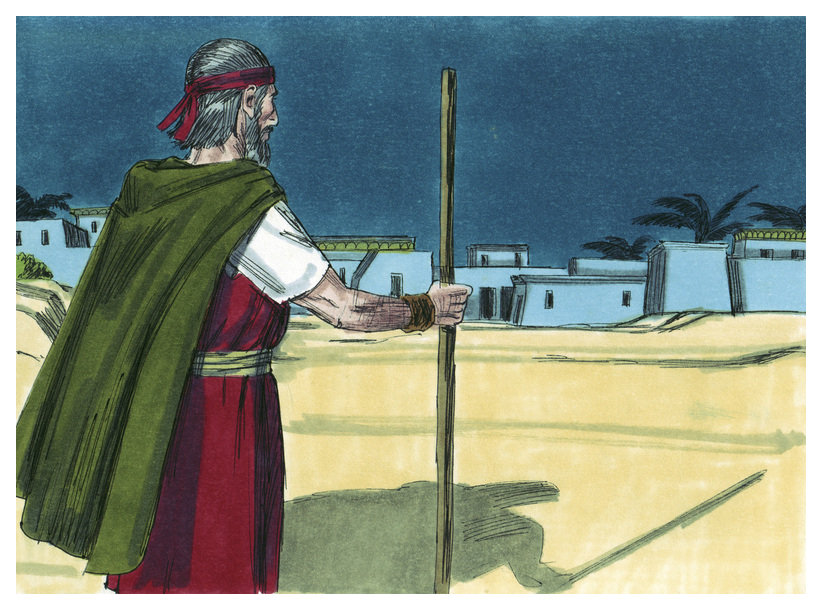
There was darkness throughout the land of Egypt. (1984 illustration by Jim Padgett, courtesy of Distant Shores Media/Sweet Publishing)

Reading the words "even darkness that could be felt" in Exodus 10:22, the Sages conjectured that it was as thick as a denar coin, for "even darkness that could be felt" implied a darkness that had substance.

Rabbi Abdimi of Haifa interpreted the words "thick darkness" in Exodus 10:22 to teach that the darkness was doubled and redoubled.

The Rabbis taught that there were seven days of darkness. During the first three days, one who wished to arise from sitting could do so, and the one who wished to sit down could do so. Concerning these days Exodus 10:22–23 says: "And there was a thick darkness in all the land of Egypt three days; and they did not see one another." During the last three days, one who sat could not stand up, one who stood could not sit down, and one who was lying down could not rise upright. Concerning these days Exodus 10:23 says: "neither rose any from his place for three days."

During the three days of thick darkness, God gave the Israelites favor in the eyes of the Egyptians, so that the Egyptians lent the Israelites everything. An Israelite would enter an Egyptian's house, and if the Israelite saw gold and silver vessels or garments, and when the Israelite asked for them, the Egyptian replied that the Egyptian had nothing to lend, the Israelite would say where the goods were. The Egyptians would then reason that had the Israelites desired to deceive the Egyptians, they could have easily taken the goods during the darkness and the Egyptians would not have noticed. But since the Israelites did not take the goods, the Egyptians reasoned that the Israelites would not keep them. And so, the Egyptians lent the Israelites their things, so as to fulfill what Genesis 15:14 foretold: "Afterward shall they come out with great substance."

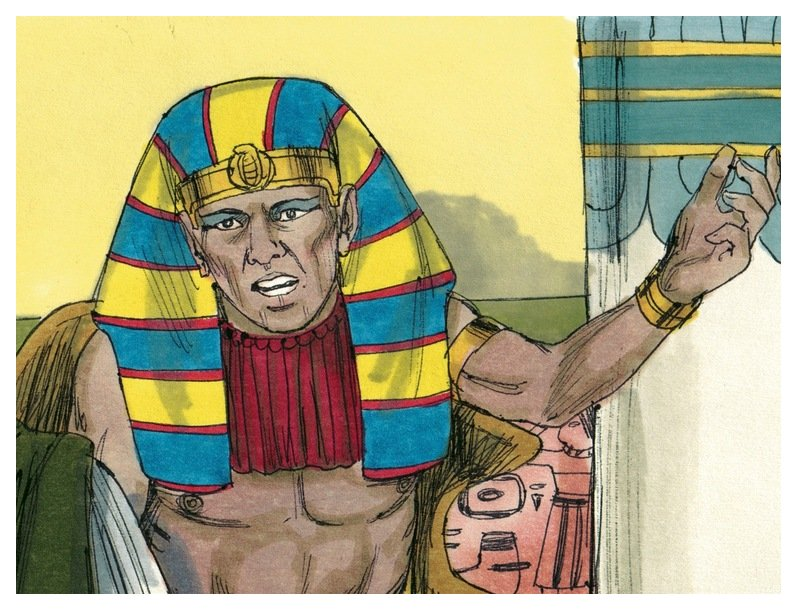
Pharaoh called Moses and said, "You may go to worship the Lord. . . . But all your animals must stay here." (1984 illustration by Jim Padgett, courtesy of Distant Shores Media/Sweet Publishing)

The midrash noted that Exodus 10:23 says: "but all the children of Israel had light in their dwellings," not, "in the land of Goshen," and concluded that light accompanied the Israelites wherever they went and illumined what was within barrels, boxes, and treasure-chests. Concerning them Psalm 119:105 says: "Your word is a lamp for my feet."

The midrash taught that the six days of darkness occurred in Egypt, while the seventh day of darkness was a day of darkness of the sea, as Exodus 14:20 says: "And there was the cloud and the darkness here, yet it gave light by night there." So God sent clouds and darkness and covered the Egyptians with darkness, but gave light to the Israelites, as God had done for them in Egypt. Hence Psalm 27:1 says: "The Lord is my light and my salvation." And the midrash taught that in the Messianic Age, as well, God will bring darkness to sinners, but light to Israel, as Isaiah 60:2 says: "For, behold, darkness shall cover the earth, and gross darkness the peoples; but upon you the Lord will shine."

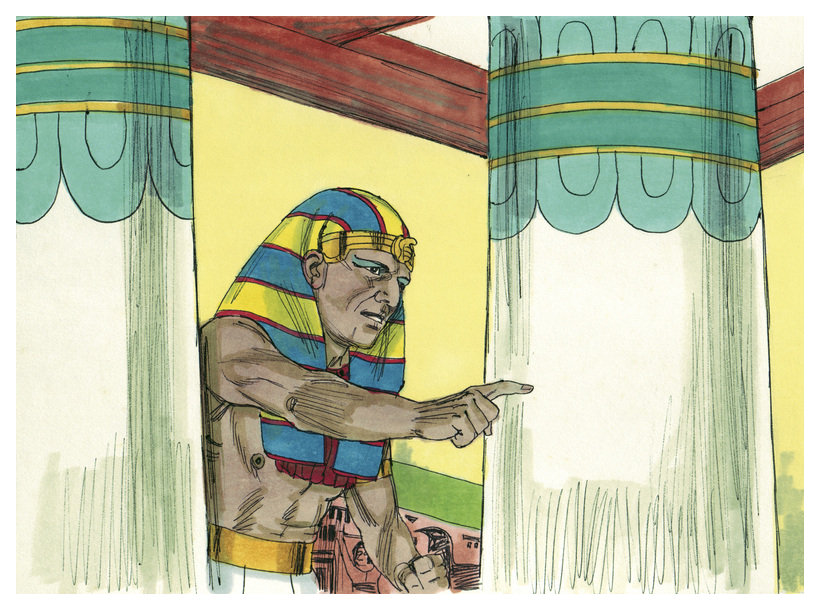
Pharaoh was very angry. (1984 illustration by Jim Padgett, courtesy of Distant Shores Media/Sweet Publishing)

A midrash noted that Exodus 7:13 reports that "Pharaoh's heart was hardened" without God's action, and that this was so for the first five plagues. As the first five plagues did not move Pharaoh to release the Israelites, God decreed that from then on, even if Pharaoh had agreed to release the Israelites, God would not accept it. Thus starting with the sixth plague and thereafter, as Exodus 10:27 reports, the text says, "the Lord hardened Pharaoh's heart."

=== Exodus chapter 11 ===
A midrash told that immediately after the exchange between Pharaoh and Moses in Exodus 10:28–29, in which Pharaoh told Moses, "Take heed to see my face no more," and Moses answered, "I will see your face again no more"—but before Moses left Pharaoh's presence—God thought that God still had to inform Pharaoh of one more plague. Immediately therefore God hurriedly entered the palace of Pharaoh for the sake of Moses, so that Moses would not appear untruthful for having said that Moses would see Pharaoh's face no more. The midrash taught that this was the only occasion when God spoke with Moses in Pharaoh's house. So God rushed into Pharaoh's palace and told Moses, as Exodus 11:1 reports, "Yet one plague more will I bring upon Pharaoh." When Moses heard this, he rejoiced. Moses then proclaimed, as Exodus 11:4 reports, "Thus says the Lord: 'About midnight will I go out into the midst of Egypt.'" Moses told Pharaoh that Pharaoh was right that Moses would see Pharaoh's face no more, for Moses would no longer come to Pharaoh, but Pharaoh would come to Moses. And not only would Pharaoh come, but also the chief of his hosts, his governor, and all his courtiers, imploring and prostrating themselves to Moses for the Israelites to depart from Egypt, as Exodus 11:8 reports that Moses said, "And all these your servants shall come down to me." Moses did not wish to say that Pharaoh would bow down to Moses, out of respect for royalty.

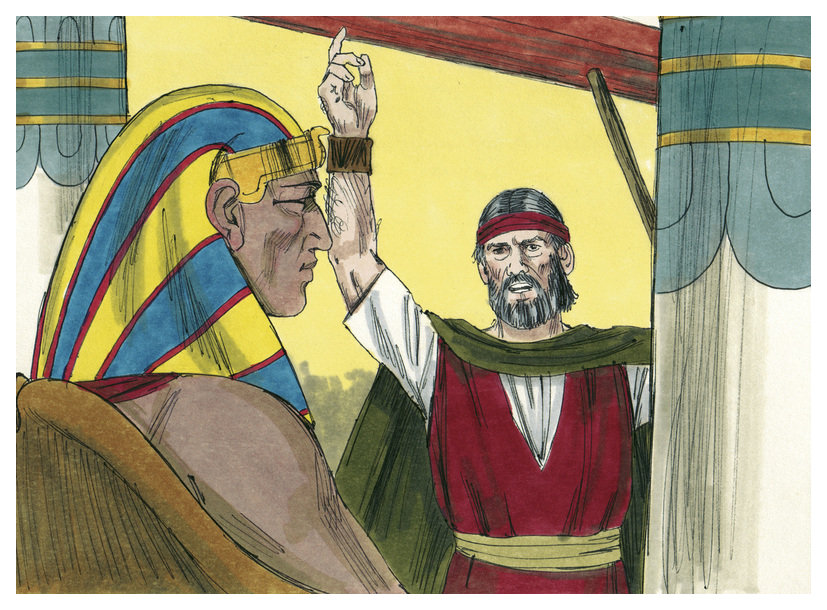
Moses delivered God's final message. (1984 illustration by Jim Padgett, courtesy of Distant Shores Media/Sweet Publishing)

The Gemara deduced from the words, "About midnight I will go out into the midst of Egypt," in Exodus 11:4 that even Moses did not know exactly when midnight fell. The Gemara reasoned that Exodus 11:4 could not say "about midnight" because God told Moses "about midnight," for God cannot have any doubt about when midnight falls. Thus the Gemara concluded that God told Moses "at midnight," and then Moses told Pharaoh "about midnight" because Moses was in doubt as to the exact moment of midnight. But Rav Zeira argued that Moses certainly knew the exact time of midnight, but said "about midnight" because he thought that Pharaoh's astrologers might make a mistake as to the exact moment of midnight and then accuse Moses of being a liar. And Rav Ashi argued that in Exodus 11:4, Moses spoke at midnight of the night of the thirteenth of Nisan as it became the fourteenth of Nisan, and thus Moses said: "God said: 'Tomorrow at the hour like the midnight of tonight, I will go out into the midst of Egypt.'"

Rabbi Johanan taught that Song of Songs 2:12 speaks of Moses when it says, "The voice of the turtle (tor) is heard in our land," reading the verse to mean, "The voice of the good explorer (tayyar) is heard in our land." Rabbi Johanan taught that Song of Songs 2:12 thus speaks of Moses at the time of which Exodus 11:4 reports: "And Moses said: 'Thus says the Lord: "About midnight will I go out into the midst of Egypt . . . ."'"

The Gemara advised that because of the principle that a dream's realization follows its interpretation, one who dreams of a dog should rise early and say the fortunate words of Exodus 11:7, "But against any of the children of Israel shall not a dog whet his tongue," before thinking of the unfortunate words of Isaiah 56:11 (regarding Israel's corrupt aristocracy), "Yea, the dogs are greedy," so as to attribute to the dream the more favorable meaning and thus the more fortunate realization.

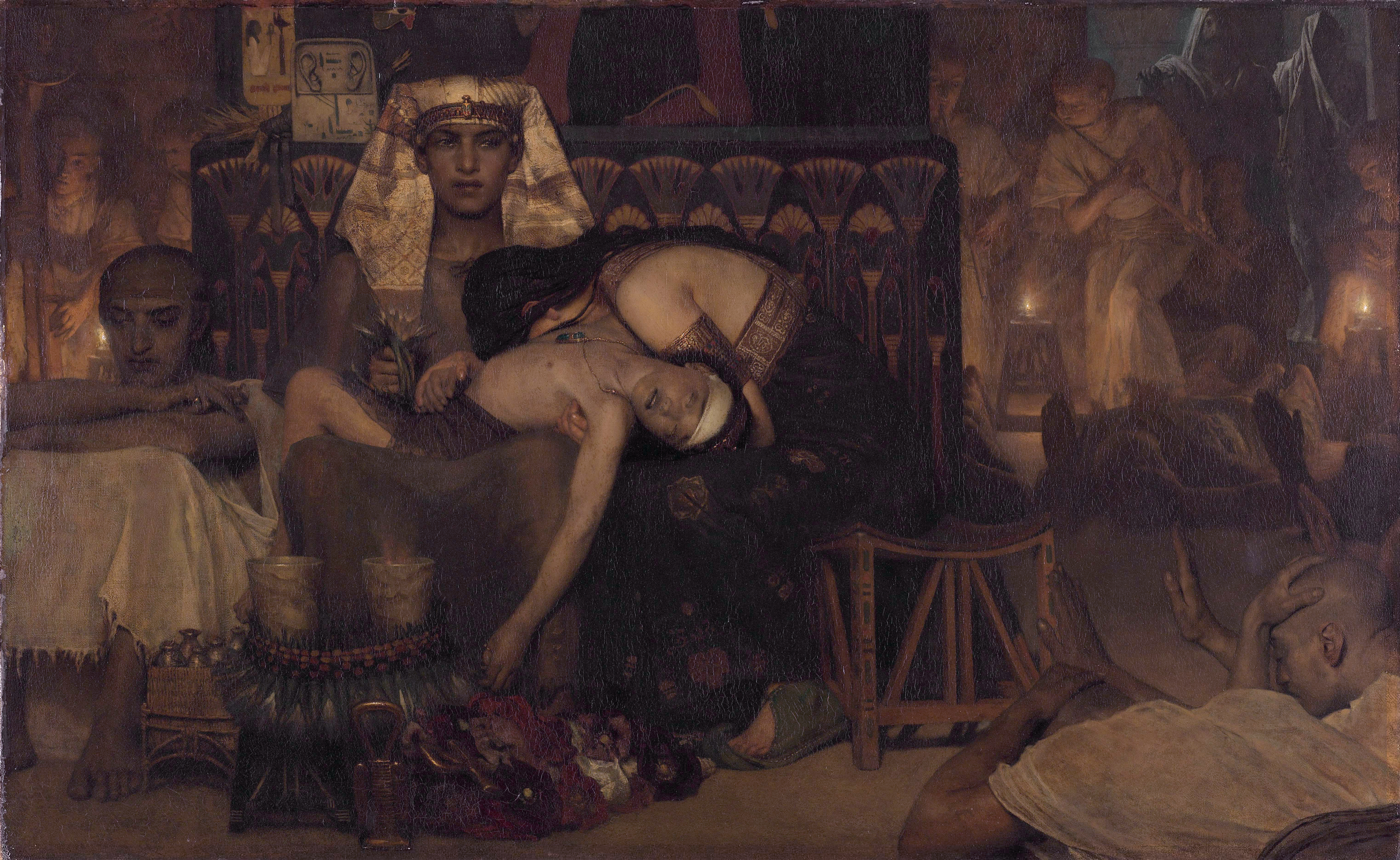
The Death of the Pharaoh's Firstborn (1872 painting by Lawrence Alma-Tadema)

Rabbi Jannai taught that one should always show respect to a ruler, following the example of Moses, who in Exodus 11:8, told Pharaoh that "all your servants shall . . . bow down to me," but out of respect for royalty did not say that Pharaoh himself would seek favors of Moses, as reported in Exodus 12:30–32. Similarly, a midrash interpreted God's instructions to Moses and Aaron in Exodus 6:13, "and to Pharaoh, King of Egypt," to convey that God told Moses and Aaron that although God really ought to punish Pharaoh, God wanted Moses and Aaron to show Pharaoh the respect due to his regal position. And Moses did so, as Exodus 11:8 reports that Moses told Pharaoh that God said, "And all these your servants shall come down to Me." Moses did not say that Pharaoh would come down, only that Pharaoh's servants would do so. But Moses could well have said that Pharaoh himself would come down, for Exodus 12:30 reports, "Pharaoh arose at midnight." But Moses did not mention Pharaoh specifically so as to pay him respect.

Rabbi Joshua ben Karhah taught that a lasting effect resulted from every instance of "fierce anger" in the Torah. The Gemara questioned whether this principle held true in the case of Exodus 11:8, which reports that Moses "went out from Pharaoh in hot anger," but does not report Moses saying anything to Pharaoh because of his anger. In response, the Gemara reported that Resh Lakish taught that Moses slapped Pharaoh before he left Pharaoh's presence.

=== Exodus chapter 12 ===
The Mishnah reported that on the fourth Sabbath of the month of Adar (Shabbat HaChodesh), congregations read Exodus 12:1–20.

The Gemara read Exodus 12:2, "This month shall be to you the beginning of months," to teach that when a new moon is observed, the month must be sanctified without delay.

The Mishnah taught that the first of Nisan is new year for kings and festivals. And the Tosefta and a baraita deduced from Exodus 12:2, "This month shall be to you the beginning of months; it shall be the first month of the year to you," that Nisan is the new year for months, and they begin to count months from Nisan.

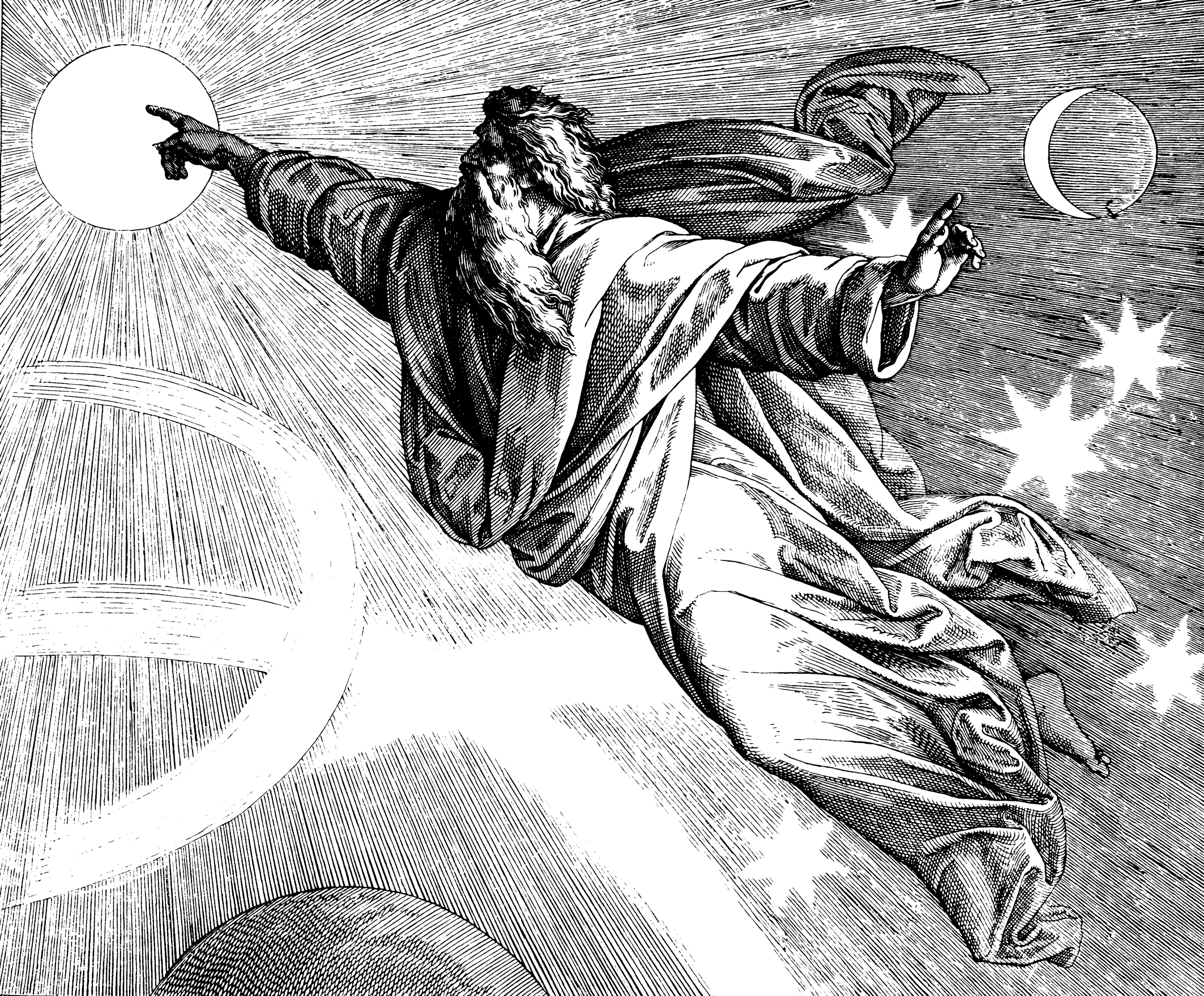
The Fourth Day of Creation (woodcut by Julius Schnorr von Carolsfeld from the 1860 Die Bibel in Bildern)

The Pirke De-Rabbi Eliezer taught when God created the sun and the moon, the entire Hebrew calendar—years, months, days, nights, seasons, and intercalation—were before God, and God intercalated the years and delivered the calculations to Adam in the Garden of Eden, as Genesis 5:1 can be read, "This is the calculation for the generations of Adam." Adam handed on the tradition to Enoch, who was initiated in the principle of intercalation, as Genesis 5:22 says, "And Enoch walked with God." Enoch passed the principle of intercalation to Noah, who conveyed the tradition to Shem, who conveyed it to Abraham, who conveyed it to Isaac, who conveyed it to Jacob, who conveyed it to Joseph and his brothers. When Joseph and his brothers died, the Israelites ceased to intercalate, as Exodus 1:6 reports, "And Joseph died, and all his brethren, and all that generation." God then revealed the principles of the Hebrew calendar to Moses and Aaron in Egypt, as Exodus 12:1–2 reports, "And the Lord spoke to Moses and Aaron in the land of Egypt saying, 'This month shall be to you the beginning of months.'" The Pirke De-Rabbi Eliezer deduced from the word "saying" in Exodus 12:1 that God said to Moses and Aaron that until then, the principle of intercalation had been with God, but from then on it was their right to intercalate the year. Thus the Israelites intercalated the year and will until Elijah returns to herald in the Messianic Age.

Rav Assi (or others say Rav Havivi) of Hozna'ah deduced from the words, "And it came to pass in the first month of the second year, on the first day of the month," in Exodus 40:17 that the Tabernacle was erected on the first of Nisan. With reference to this, a Tanna taught that the first of Nisan took ten crowns of distinction by virtue of the ten momentous events that occurred on that day. The first of Nisan was: (1) the first day of the Creation (as reported in Genesis 1:1–5), (2) the first day of the princes' offerings (as reported in Numbers 7:10–17), (3) the first day for the priesthood to make the sacrificial offerings (as reported in Leviticus 9:1–21), (4) the first day for public sacrifice, (5) the first day for the descent of fire from Heaven (as reported in Leviticus 9:24), (6) the first for the priests' eating of sacred food in the sacred area, (7) the first for the dwelling of the Shechinah in Israel (as implied by Exodus 25:8), (8) the first for the Priestly Blessing of Israel (as reported in Leviticus 9:22, employing the blessing prescribed by Numbers 6:22–27), (9) the first for the prohibition of the high places (as stated in Leviticus 17:3–4), and (10) the first of the months of the year (as instructed in Exodus 12:2).

Midrash Tanḥuma explained that before the Israelites erected the Tabernacle, God spoke to Moses from the burning bush, as Exodus 3:4 says, "God called to him out of the bush." After that, God spoke to Moses in Midian, as Exodus 4:19 says, "The Lord said to Moses in Midian." After that, God spoke to Moses in Egypt, as Exodus 12:1 says, "The Lord said to Moses and Aaron in the land of Egypt." After that, God spoke to Moses at Sinai, as Numbers 1:1 says, "The Lord spoke to Moses in the wilderness of Sinai." Once the Israelites erected the Tabernacle, God said, "modesty is beautiful," as Micah 6:8 says, "and to walk humbly with your God," and God began talking with Moses in the Tent of Meeting.

The Gemara cited Exodus 12:2 for the proposition that one should begin studying the laws of Passover two weeks before the festival. The Gemara reported that a baraita taught that one begins studying the laws of Passover 30 days before Passover. Rabban Shimon ben Gamliel, however, taught that one begins studying those laws two weeks before the festival. The Gemara reported that a reason for Rabban Shimon ben Gamliel's position might be the report of Exodus 12:2 that Moses was standing on the first day of Nisan and instructing about the performance of the first Passover when God said, "This month shall be for you the beginning of the months, the first of the months of the year," and in the next verse, God began the instructions for the first Passover.

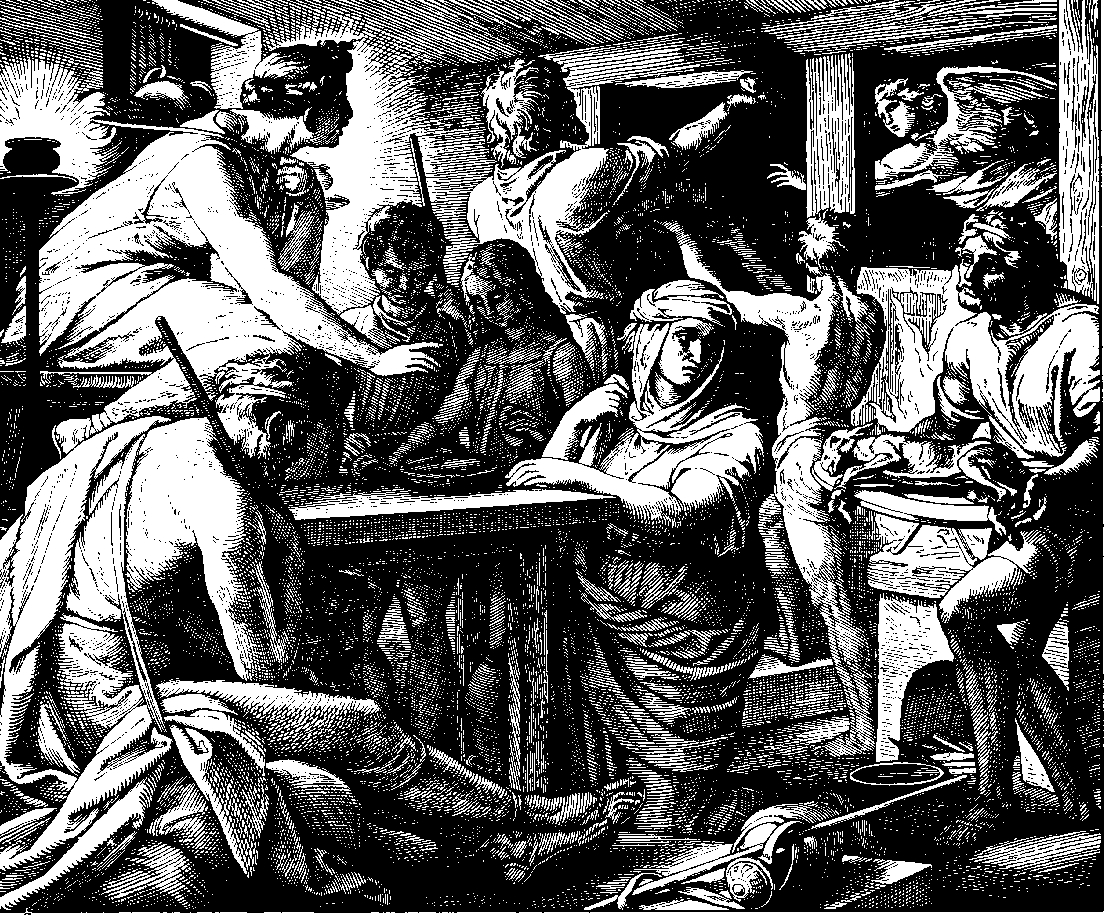
The Origin of the Paschal Lamb (woodcut by Julius Schnorr von Carolsfeld from the 1860 Die Bibel in Bildern)

Tractate Beitzah in the Mishnah, Tosefta, Jerusalem Talmud, and Babylonian Talmud interpreted the laws common to all of the festivals in Exodus 12:3–27, 43–49; 13:6–10; 23:16; 34:18–23; Leviticus 16; 23:4–43; Numbers 9:1–14; 28:16–30:1; and Deuteronomy 16:1–17; 31:10–13.

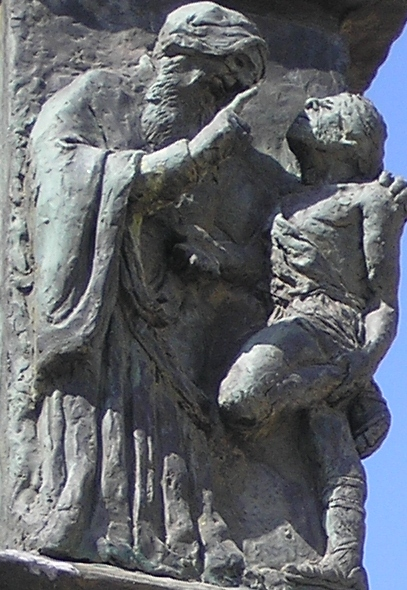
Hillel (sculpture at the Knesset Menorah, Jerusalem)

Tractate Pesachim in the Mishnah, Tosefta, Jerusalem Talmud, and Babylonian Talmud interpreted the laws of the Passover in Exodus 12:3–27, 43–49; 13:6–10; 23:15; 34:25; Leviticus 23:4–8; Numbers 9:1–14; 28:16–25; and Deuteronomy 16:1–8. And elsewhere, the Mishnah taught that intent to eat the Passover offering raw (violating the commandment of Exodus 12:9) or to break the bones of the offering (violating the commandment of Exodus 12:46) did not invalidate the offering itself. The Mishnah in tractate Challah taught that anyone who eats an olive's bulk of unleavened bread (מַצָּה, matzah) on Passover has fulfilled the obligation of Exodus 12:18, and interpreted Exodus 12:15 to teach that anyone who eats an olive's bulk of leavened bread (חָמֵץ, chametz) on Passover is liable to being cut off from the Jewish people. Similarly, the Mishnah in tractate Beitzah reported that the House of Shammai held that an olive's bulk of leavening or a date's bulk (which is more than an olive's bulk) of leavened bread in one's house made one liable, but the House of Hillel held that an olive's bulk of either made one liable. The Gemara noted that the command in Exodus 12:18 to eat unleavened bread on the first night of Passover applies to women (as did the command in Deuteronomy 31:12 for all Israelites to assemble), even though the general rule is that women are exempt from time-bound positive commandments. The Gemara cited these exceptions to support Rabbi Johanan's assertion that one may not draw inferences from general rules, for they often have exceptions.

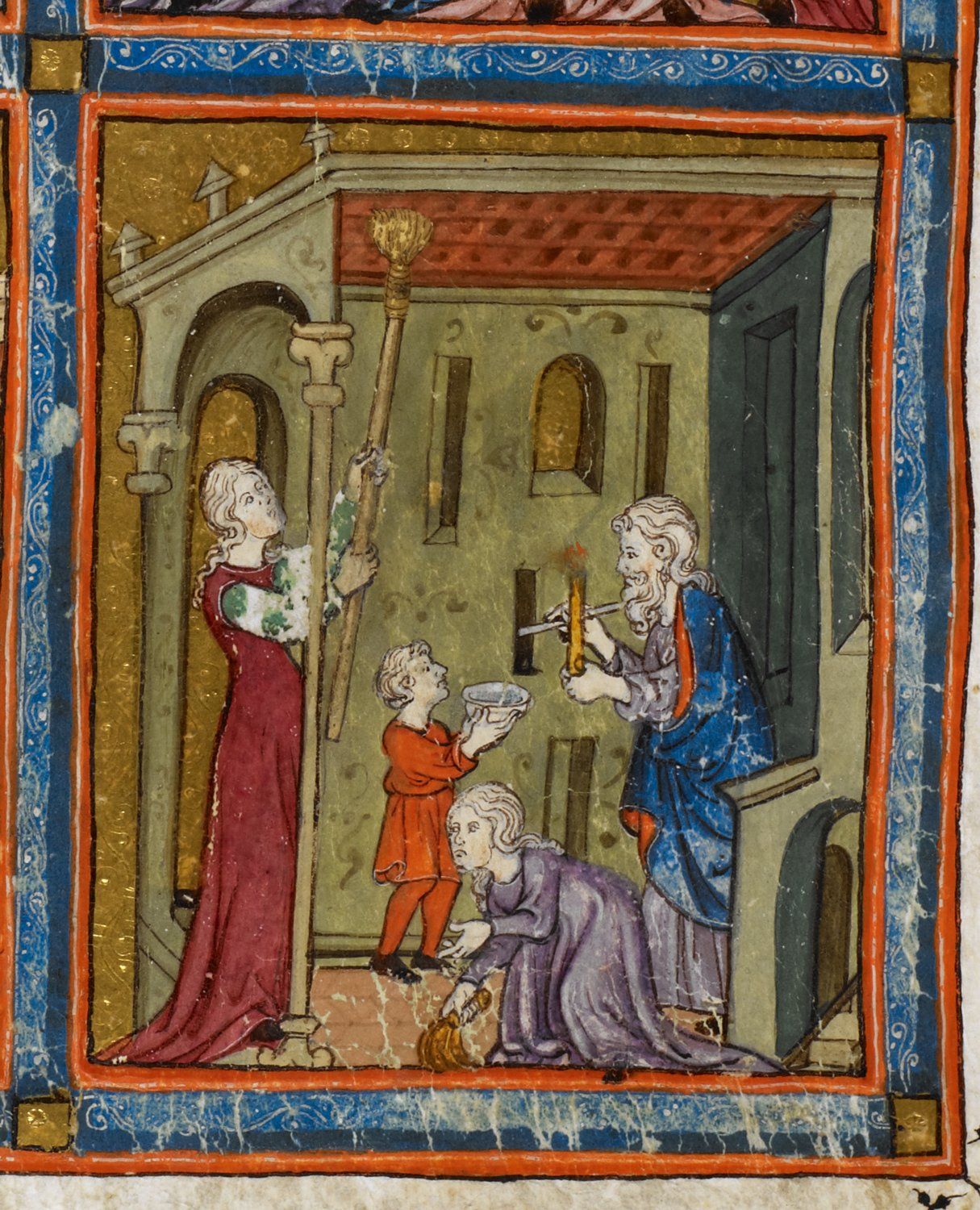
Jews searching for leaven (scene from The Golden Haggadah, circa 1320)

The Mishnah taught that on the evening of the 14th of Nisan, Jews searched for leavened food in the house by candlelight. Any place into which one did not bring leavened food did not require checking. The Sages taught that one needed to check two rows in a wine cellar, as it was a place into which one brought leavened food. The House of Shammai taught that one needed to check the two front rows of the entire wine cellar, but the House of Hillel taught that one needed to check only the two outer rows that were uppermost. They did not worry that perhaps a weasel had dragged leavened bread from house to house, or from place to place, for if they had, they would have had to worry that the weasel had dragged leavened bread from courtyard to courtyard and from city to city, and there would have been no end to the matter. Rabbi Judah taught that they searched for leavened foods on the evening of the 14th, and on the morning of the 14th, and at the time that they destroyed the leavened foods (in the sixth hour—between 11 a.m. and noon). But the Sages maintained that if they did not search on the evening of the 14th, they needed to search on the 14th; if they did not search in the morning of the 14th, they needed to search at the time that they destroyed the leavened foods; if they did not search at that time, they needed to search after that time. And what they left over for the last morning meal before the Festival, they needed to put away in a hidden place, so that they should not need to search after it. Rabbi Meir taught that they could eat leavened foods through the fifth hour of the morning, and needed to burn it at the beginning of the sixth hour. Rabbi Judah taught that they could eat it through the fourth hour of the morning, needed to keep it in suspense during the fifth hour, and needed to burn it at the beginning of the sixth hour. Rabbi Judah also told that they used to put two unfit loaves of the thank offering on the roof of the Temple portico, and as long as the loaves lay there, all the people would eat leavened foods. When they would remove one loaf, the people would keep leavened foods in suspense, neither eating nor burning it. And when they removed both loaves, the people began burning their leavened foods. Rabban Gamaliel taught that unconsecrated leavened bread (חולין, chullin) could be eaten through the fourth hour of the morning, and leavened bread that was a heave-offering (תְּרוּמָה, terumah) could be eaten through the fifth hour, and they burned them at the beginning of the sixth hour. The Mishnah taught that during the entire time that one was permitted to eat leavened food, one was allowed to feed it to cattle, beasts, and birds; sell it to a gentile; and otherwise to benefit from it. When its period had passed, benefit from it was forbidden, and one was not even allowed to fire an oven or a pot range with it. Rabbi Judah taught that there was no destruction of leavened food except by burning. But the Sages maintained that one could also crumble it and throw it to the wind or casts it into the sea.

The Mishnah lists eating unleavened bread on Passover among 36 transgressions for which one may be liable to excision (כָּרֵת, karet).

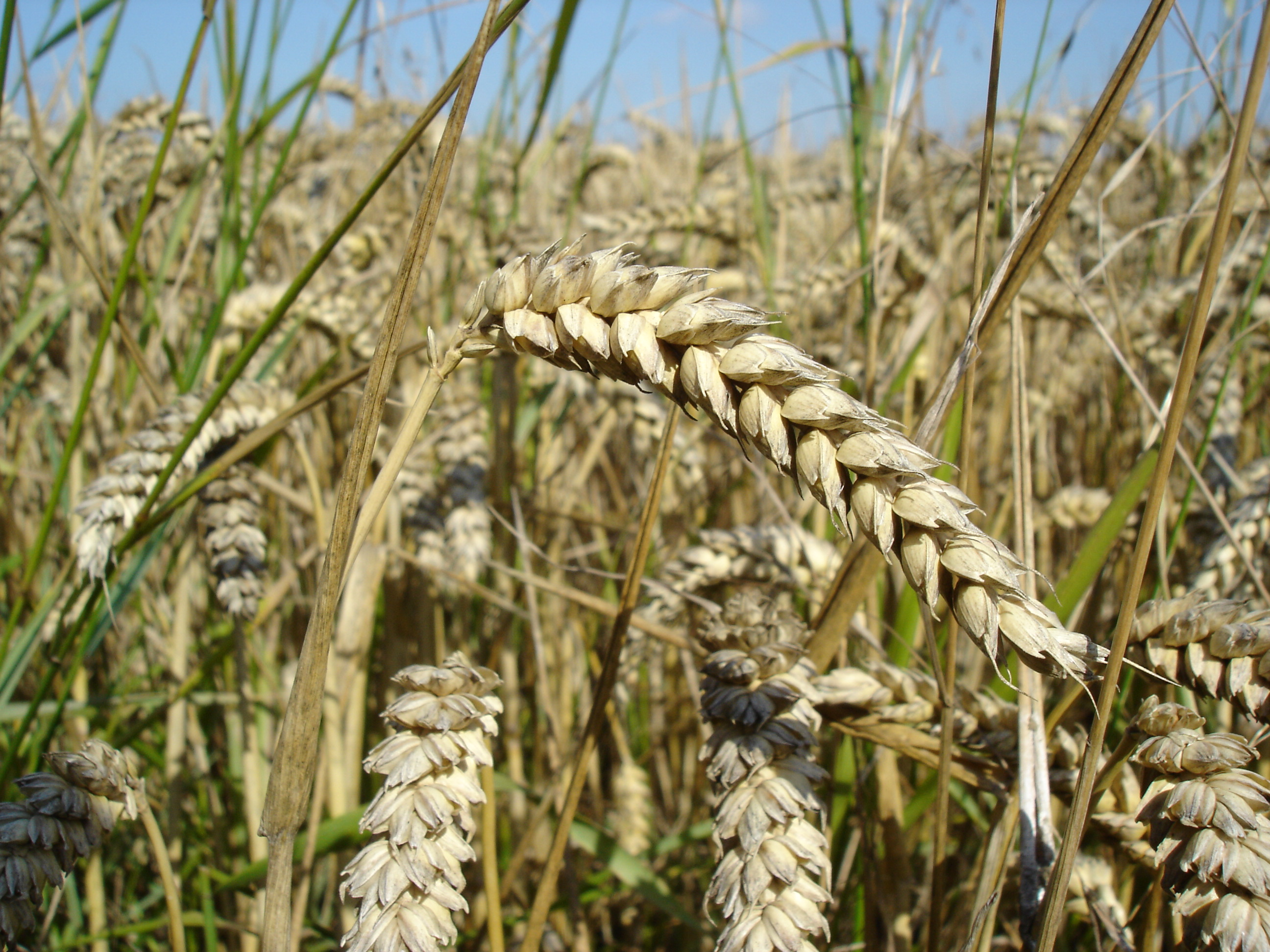
Wheat

The Mishnah taught that the grains with which one could discharge one's obligation (pursuant to Exodus 12:18) to eat unleavened bread (מַצָּה, matzah) on Passover included wheat, barley, spelt, rye, and oats. And the Mishnah taught that they discharged their obligation even with unleavened bread made from agricultural produce for which it was uncertain whether tithes had been separated (דמאי, demai), with first tithe whose heave-offering had been separated, and with second tithe or consecrated materials that had been redeemed. And priests could discharge their obligation with unleavened bread made from the portion of dough that was given to priests (challah) and heave-offering (תְּרוּמָה, terumah). But one could not discharge the obligation with unleavened bread made from grain that was mixed or untithed (tevel), nor with first tithe whose heave-offering had not been separated, nor with second tithe or consecrated materials that had not been redeemed. As to the unleavened loaves of the thank offering and the wafers brought by a nazirite (נָזִיר, nazir), the Sages made this distinction: If one made them for oneself, one could not discharge the obligation with them. But if one made them to sell in the market to those who required such products, one could discharge the obligation with them.

The Mishnah reported that if the 14th of Nisan falls on the Sabbath, Rabbi Meir taught that one must destroy leaven before the Sabbath (except for that required for the beginning of the Sabbath itself). But the Sages maintained that one destroys the leaven at its usual time (on the morning of the 14th). Rabbi Eleazar bar Zadok taught that one had to destroy consecrated meat before the Sabbath (because if any was left, none could eat it), and unconsecrated food at its usual time (because one could easily find eaters for it). The Mishnah taught that those on the way to perform religious duties who recollect leaven at home, if they are able to go back, destroy it, and then return to the religious duty, must go back and destroy it. But if they cannot, then they annul it in their heart. Similarly, those on the way to save people from an emergency annul it in their heart. But those on their way to appoint a Sabbath station to set the limits of where they may travel on the Sabbath must return immediately to destroy the leaven. Similarly, those who left Jerusalem and recollected that they had consecrated meat with them, if they had passed Mount Scopus, they burned it where they were. But if they had not traveled that far, they returned and burned it in front of the Temple with the wood arranged for use in the altar. The Mishnah then discussed for what quantity they had to return. Rabbi Meir said for both leaven and consecrated meat, they had to return for a quantity as much as an egg. Rabbi Judah said when there was as much as an olive. But the Sages ruled that for consecrated meat, they had to return for as much as an olive; while for leaven, they had to return for as much as an egg.

The Mishnah taught that where inhabitants customarily worked on the eve of Passover until noon, one could do so, while in a place where inhabitants customarily did not work, one could not. One who traveled from a place where they did work to a place where they did not work, or from a place where they did not work to a place where they did work, was bound by the stringencies of either. The Mishnah taught that a person should not deviate from the established customs of a place because of the disagreement to which such conduct could lead.

Rabbi Ḥanina, the adjunct head of the priests, taught that during all the days of the priests, they never refrained from burning sacrificial meat (terumah) that had become impure by a secondary source of impurity along with sacrificial meat that had become impure by a primary source of impurity, even though it would add impurity to impurity. Rabbi Akiva added that during all the days of the priests, they never refrained from lighting oil that had become unfit by contact with a person who had immersed that day for purification but who still needed to wait for nightfall to become fully pure (a tevul yom) in a lamp that had become impure by one who had become impure by a corpse, even though by so doing they would add impurity to impurity. Based on those teachings, Rabbi Meir argued that on Passover, priests could burn sacrificial meat that was pure but included leavening (chamets), together with sacrificial meat that was impure. Rabbi Jose replied that such a case was not analogous. Even Rabbi Eliezer and Rabbi Joshua conceded that each was burned separately. They did disagree, however, about sacrificial meat whose status of purity was in question and impure sacrificial meat, where Rabbi Eliezer taught that each had to be burned separately, whereas Rabbi Joshua taught that both of them could be burned together.

The Sages reported that in Judah, they would work on the eve of Passover until noon, while in the Galilee they did not work at all that day. On the evening of the fourteenth of Nisan in places like the Galilee, the School of Shammai forbad work, but the School of Hillel allowed it until sunrise. Rabbi Meir taught that on the fourteenth, one could finish work that one had started before the fourteenth, but one could not start work on the fourteenth even if one could finish it that day. The Sages taught that tailors, barbers, and launderers could work on the eve of Passover until noon, and Rabbi Jose ben Judah taught that even shoe strap-makers could do so. The Mishnah taught that one could place chickens in hatching-coops on the fourteenth, could place a hen that had run away back in its place, and could place another hen in the place of a hen that died. On the fourteenth, one could rake out the stable dung from under the feet of domesticated animals, but only to remove it to the sides of the stable during the days of the festival. One could carry vessels and other articles to and from the house of a craftsperson, even if they were not needed during the festival. The Mishnah taught that the men of Jericho would graft palm trees the entire day of the fourteenth, and the Sages did not protest.

The Mishnah reported that whereas priests usually slaughtered the daily offering half an hour after the eighth hour and sacrificed it an hour later, on the eve of Passover, priests slaughtered the daily offering half an hour after the seventh hour and sacrificed it an hour later, whether the eve of Passover fell on a weekday or the Sabbath. But if the eve of Passover fell on Friday, priests slaughtered the daily offering half an hour after the sixth hour and sacrificed it an hour later, and then sacrificed the Passover sacrifice after it.

The Mishnah taught that a Passover sacrifice was disqualified if it was slaughtered without specific intent for it, or if its blood was received or brought to the altar or sprinkled without specific intent for it, or if any sacrificial act was done without specific intent for it. A sacrificial act was done without specific intent for a Passover sacrifice if it was done with the intention that it be a peace offering (shelamim). The Mishnah taught that a Passover sacrifice was disqualified if it was slaughtered for people who were not qualified to eat it, such as uncircumcised men or people in a state of impurity. But it was fit if it was slaughtered for people who able to eat it and people who were not able to eat it, or for people who were designated for it and people who were not designated for it, or for men circumcised and men uncircumcised, or for people in a state of impurity and people in a state of purity. It was disqualified if it was slaughtered before noon, as Leviticus 23:5 says, "Between the evenings." It was fit if it was slaughtered before the daily offering of the afternoon, but only if someone had been stirring the blood until the blood of the daily offering had been sprinkled. And if that blood had already been sprinkled, the Passover sacrifice was still fit.

The Mishnah taught that one transgressed a negative commandment if one slaughtered a Passover sacrifice while in the possession of leavened grain products (chamets). Rabbi Judah taught that this also applied to the daily offering. Rabbi Simeon taught that if one slaughtered a Passover sacrifice on the fourteenth with specific intent for it, one was guilty, but if one slaughtered it without specific intent, one was exempt. For all other sacrifices, however, whether they were with or without specific intent, one was exempt. If one slaughtered a Passover sacrifice on the festival of Passover itself with specific intent, one was exempt; if without specific intent, one was guilty. With respect to all other sacrifices, one was guilty if one sacrificed them during the festival with or without specific intent, except for offerings brought to expiate sin (chatat) slaughtered without specific intent.

The Mishnah reported that they slaughtered the Passover sacrifice in three groups—assembly, congregation, and Israel—as Exodus 12:6 says, "The whole assembly of the congregation of Israel shall slaughter it." The first group entered until they filled the Temple courtyard, and then they closed the courtyard gates. Then they sounded Tekiah (a long uninterrupted call), Teruah (a long staccato call), and Tekiah. The priests would stand in double rows holding beakers of silver and beakers of gold, one row completely silver, and one row completely gold. None of the beakers had flat bottoms, so that the priests could not put them down and allow the blood coagulate.

A common Israelite would slaughter the Passover sacrifice, and a priest would receive the blood and give it to a fellow priest, who would give it to a fellow priest, and so on until the priest nearest to the altar would sprinkle it in one sprinkling at the base of the altar. That priest would then return an empty beaker to the priest next to him, who would give it to a fellow priest, and so on, each priest both receiving full beakers and also returning empty beakers.

When the first group went out, the second group entered; when the second went out, the third entered. Each group proceeded alike. Each group would recite the Hallel (Psalms 113–118). If they finished it, they would repeat it, but during all their days, they never recited it a third time. Rabbi Judah told that during all the days of the third group, they never got as far as Psalm 116:1, "I love that the Lord should hear (ahavti ki yishma Adonai)," because that group was small.

The Mishnah taught that where inhabitants customarily ate roasted meat on Passover night, one could eat it, while where inhabitants customarily did not to eat it, one could not eat it.

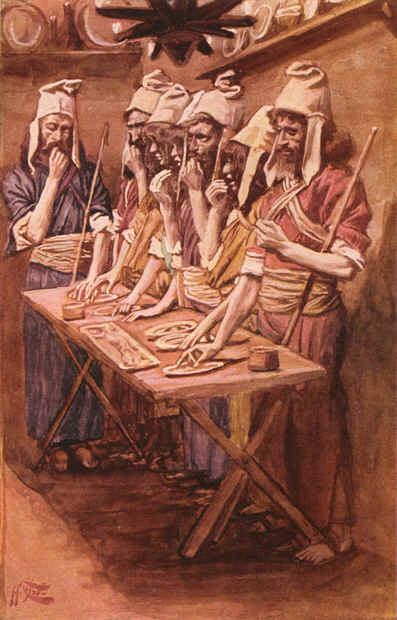
The Jews' Passover (watercolor circa 1896–1902 by James Tissot)

Chapter 10 of Mishnah Pesachim taught the procedure for the Passover Seder. On the eve of Passover, no one was to eat from before the Minhah offering (about 3:00 pm) until nightfall. That night, even the poorest people in Israel were not to eat until they reclined in the fashion of free people. Every person was to drink not less than four cups of wine, even if the public charities had to provide it.

But one was not to eat unleavened bread (מַצָּה, matzah) during the day before the Seder. Rabbi Levi said that those who eat unleavened bread on the day before Passover are like those who cohabit with their betrothed before they are fully married. Rava used to drink wine all day before the Seder so as to whet his appetite to eat more unleavened bread in the evening.

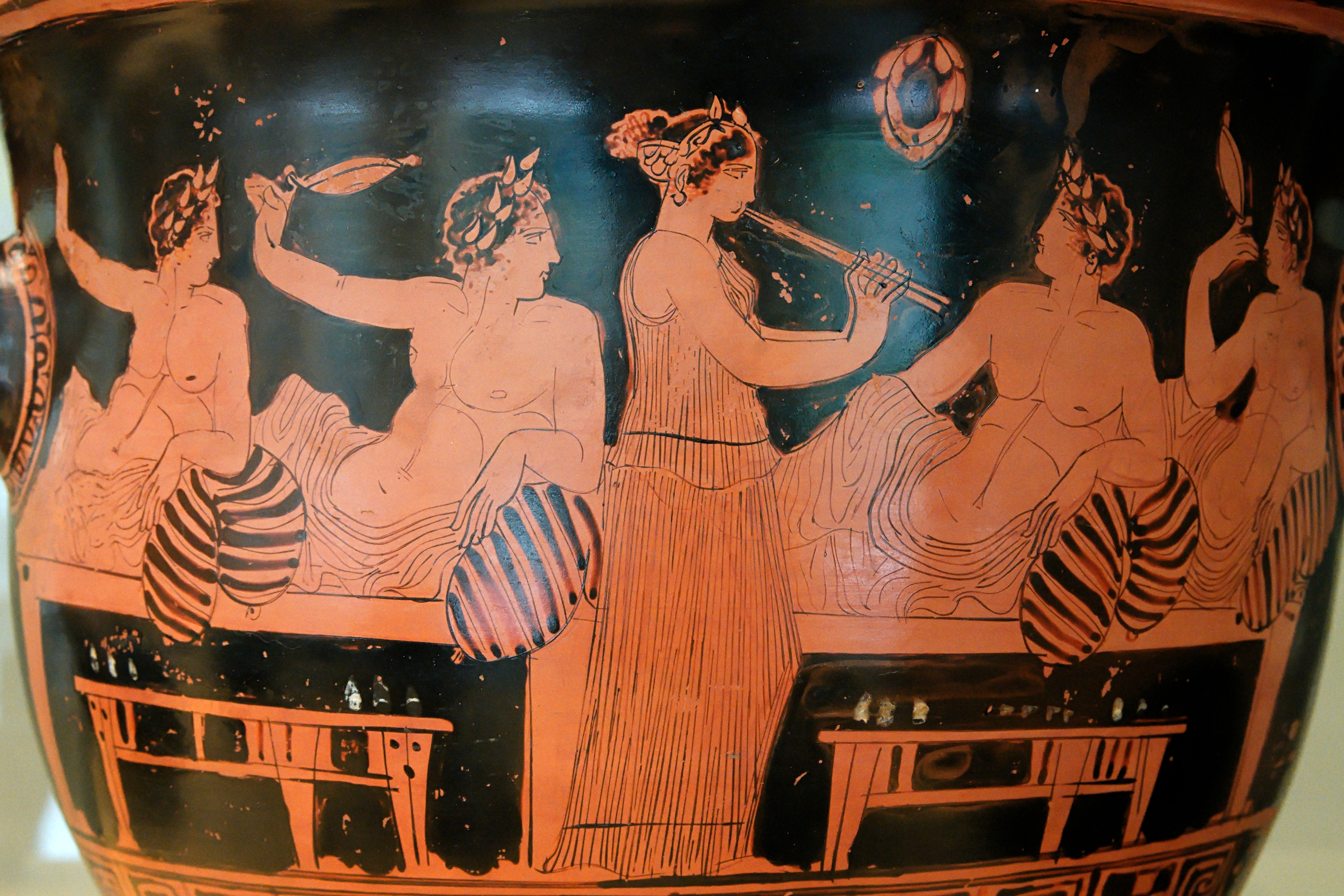
Greek men reclining at a symposium—after which reclining at the Passover seder is modeled (scene from an Attic krater circa 420 BCE)

The Gemara taught that one needed to recline for the eating of the unleavened bread (מַצָּה, matzah) and for the drinking of the wine, but not for the bitter herbs.

A baraita taught that each of the four cups of wine needed to contain at least a reviis of wine (the volume of one and a half eggs, or roughly 4 to 5 ounces). And Rav Nachman bar Yitzchak taught that one must drink most of each cup.

The Tosefta taught that it is a religious duty for one to bring joy to one's children and dependents on Passover. The Tosefta taught that one brings them joy with wine, as Psalm 104:15 says, "wine . . . makes glad the heart of man." Rabbi Judah taught that one gives to women what is suitable to bring them joy and to children what is suitable to bring them joy. Similarly, in the Babylonian Talmud, the Rabbis taught that Jews are duty bound to make their children and their household rejoice on a Festival, for Deuteronomy 16:14 says, "And you shall rejoice it, your feast, you and your son and your daughter." The Gemara taught that one makes them rejoice with wine. Rabbi Judah taught that men gladden with what is suitable for them, and women with what is suitable for them. The Gemara explained that what is suitable for men is wine. And Rav Joseph taught that in Babylonia, they gladdened women with colored garments, while in the Land of Israel, they gladdened women with pressed linen garments. Rabbi Judah ben Bathyra taught that in the days of the Temple in Jerusalem, Jews could not rejoice without meat (from an offering), as Deuteronomy 27:7 says, "And you shall sacrifice peace-offerings, and shall eat there; and you shall rejoice before the Lord your God." But now that the Temple no longer exists, Jews cannot rejoice without wine, as Psalm 104:15 says, "And wine gladdens the heart of man."

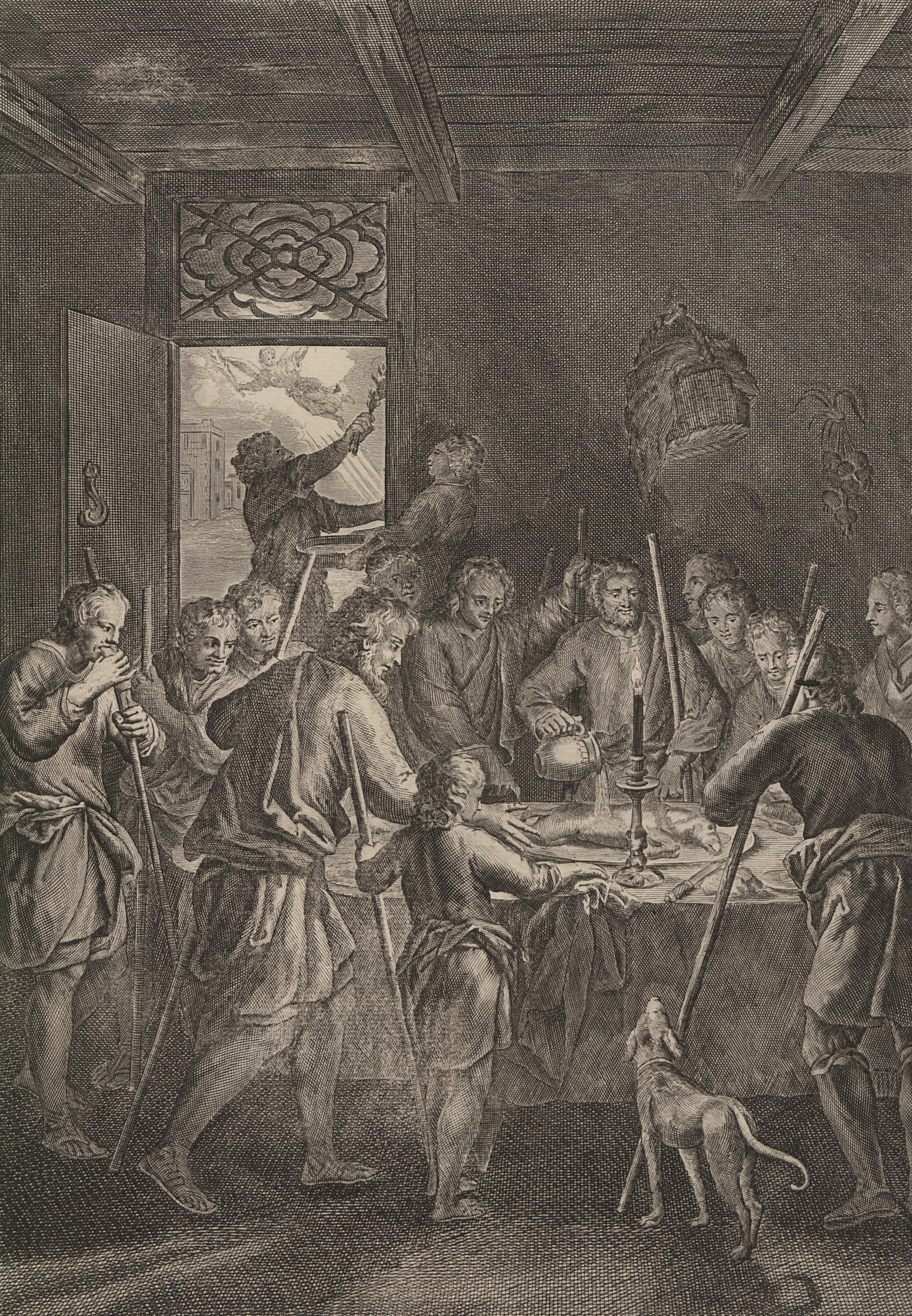
The Israelites Eat the Passover (illustration from the 1728 Figures de la Bible)

The Mishnah continued that they mixed the first cup of wine for the leader of the Seder. The House of Shammai taught that the leader first recited a blessing for the day, and then a blessing over the wine, while the House of Hillel ruled that the leader first recited a blessing over the wine, and then recited a blessing for the day.

Then they set food before the leader. The leader dipped and ate lettuce (which was karpas) before the bread. They set before the leader unleavened bread (מַצָּה, matzah), lettuce (hazeret), charoset, and two cooked dishes. The charoset was not mandatory, although Rabbi Eleazar son of Rabbi Zadok said that it was. In the days of the Temple in Jerusalem, they would bring the body of the Passover lamb before the leader.

The Mishnah listed several vegetables that could fulfill the requirement to have a bitter herb (maror). They have been translated as lettuce, chicory, pepperwort, endives, and dandelion.

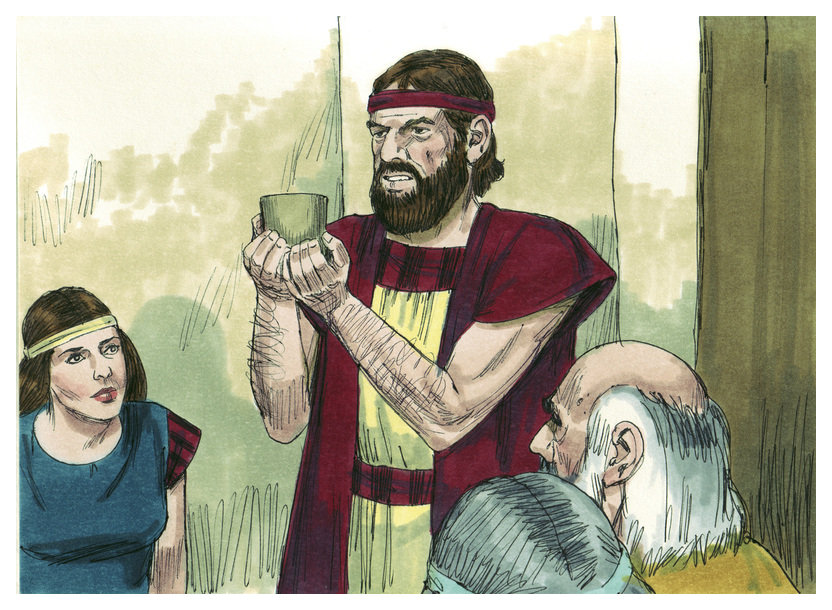
They drank wine at the Passover meal. (1984 illustration by Jim Padgett, courtesy of Distant Shores Media/Sweet Publishing)

They filled a second cup of wine for the leader. Then a child asked questions. If the child was not intelligent, the parent would instruct the child to ask why this night was different from all other nights. On all other nights they ate leavened and unleavened bread, while on this night they ate only unleavened bread (מַצָּה, matzah). On all other nights, they ate all kinds of herbs, while on this night they ate only bitter herbs. (Early editions of the Mishnah and some editions of the Jerusalem Talmud did not include this item.) On all other nights, they ate meat roasted, stewed, or boiled, while on this night they ate only roasted meat. On all other nights, they dipped once, while on this night they dipped twice. (While the Jerusalem Talmud preserved this reading, some editions of the Babylonian Talmud emended this item to read, "On all other nights we do not have to dip even one time . . . .") And the parent instructed according to the child's intelligence. The parent began to answer the questions by recounting the people's humble beginnings and concluded with the people's praise. The parent recounted the credo of Deuteronomy 26:5–8, "My father was a wandering Aramean . . . ."

The Four Questions
	Jerusalem Talmud	Babylonian Talmud	Contemporary Haggadot
1	Dipping	Matzah	Matzah
2	Matzah	Maror	Maror
3	Roasted meat	Roasted meat	Dipping
4		Dipping	Reclining

The Rabbis taught in a baraita that if a child is intelligent enough to ask the four questions, the child asks them. If the child is not intelligent enough, the wife asks them. If the wife does not ask the questions, the leader of the seder asks them. And even two scholars who know the laws of Passover must ask one another (if no one else can ask).

The Mishnah stated that one answer to the questions of why this night is different from all other nights is that on all other nights we dip once; however, on this night we dip twice. In the Babylonian Talmud, Rava objected to this statement, questioning whether on every other day there was a requirement to dip once. Rather, Rava said that the Mishnah taught that on all other nights we are not obligated to dip even once; however, on this night we are obligated to dip twice. Rav Safra objected to this explanation, questioning whether one could deduce this from what we do simply to arouse children's curiosity. Rather, Rav Safra said that the Mishnah taught that normally we do not dip even once; however, on this night we dip twice.

The Mishnah taught that the parent begins the answer with disgrace and concludes with glory. The Gemara asked what the Mishnah meant by "with disgrace." In the Babylonian Talmud, Rav (Abba Arika) taught that the disgrace was that at first our forefathers were idol worshippers, while Samuel of Nehardea taught that the disgrace was that we were slaves. In the Jerusalem Talmud, Rav taught one must begin with Joshua's words in Joshua 24:2–3 (explaining that Terah worshipped idols), "Your fathers dwelt of old time beyond the River, even Terah, the father of Abraham, and the father of Nahor; and they served other gods." (Jews therefore follow Joshua's model, tracing their ignoble origins to the idolatrous background of their ancestors.)

Rabbi Akiva would distribute popcorn and nuts to children on the eve of Passover, so that they might not fall asleep but ask the four questions. Rabbi Eliezer taught that the unleavened bread (מַצָּה, matzah) was eaten hastily on the night of Passover, on account of the children, so that they should not fall asleep. Rabbi Akiva never said in the house of study that it was time to stop studying, except on the eve of Passover and the eve of the Day of Atonement. On the eve of Passover, it was because of the children, so that they might not fall asleep, and on the eve of the Day of Atonement, it was so that they should feed their children before the fast.

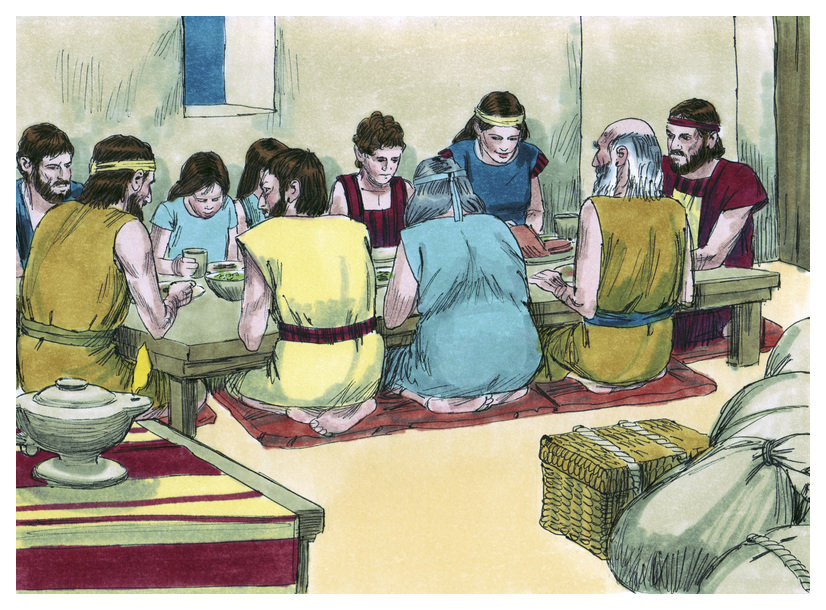
That night each family roasted its lamb. (1984 illustration by Jim Padgett, courtesy of Distant Shores Media/Sweet Publishing)

The Mekhilta of Rabbi Ishmael taught that there are four types of children (as evinced by the four times—in Exodus 12:26; 13:8; 13:14; and Deuteronomy 6:20—that Scripture reports telling a child)—the wise, the simple, the wicked, and the type who does not know how to ask. The wise child asks, in the words of Deuteronomy 6:20: "What mean the testimonies, and the statutes, and the ordinances, that the Lord our God has commanded you?" The Mekhilta taught that we explain to this child all the laws of Passover. The simple child asks, in the words of Exodus 13:14: "What is this?" The Mekhilta taught that we respond simply with the words of Exodus 13:14: "By strength of hand the Lord brought us out from Egypt, from the house of bondage." The wicked child asks, in the words of Exodus 12:26: "What do you mean by this service?" The Mekhilta taught that because wicked children exclude themselves, we should also exclude this child in answering and say, in the words of Exodus 13:8: "It is because of what the Lord did for me when I came forth out of Egypt"—for me but not for you; had you been there, you would not have been saved. As for the child who does not know how to ask, the Mekhilta taught that we take the initiative, as Exodus 13:8 says (without having reported that the child asked), "You shall tell your child on that day."

Rabban Gamaliel said that one needed to mention three things on Passover to discharge one's duty: the Passover offering, unleavened bread (מַצָּה, matzah), and bitter herbs (maror). The Passover offering was sacrificed because God passed over the Israelites' houses in Egypt. They ate unleavened bread because the Israelites were redeemed from Egypt. And they ate bitter herbs because the Egyptians embittered the lives of the Israelites in Egypt. In every generation, all were bound to regard themselves as though they personally had gone out of Egypt, because Exodus 13:8 says, "You shall tell your child in that day: 'It is because of what the Lord did for me when I came out of Egypt.'" Therefore, it was everyone's duty to thank and praise God for performing those miracles for the Israelites and their descendants. God brought them forth from bondage into freedom, from sorrow into joy, from mourning into festivity, from darkness into light, and from servitude into redemption. Therefore, they were to say hallelujah!

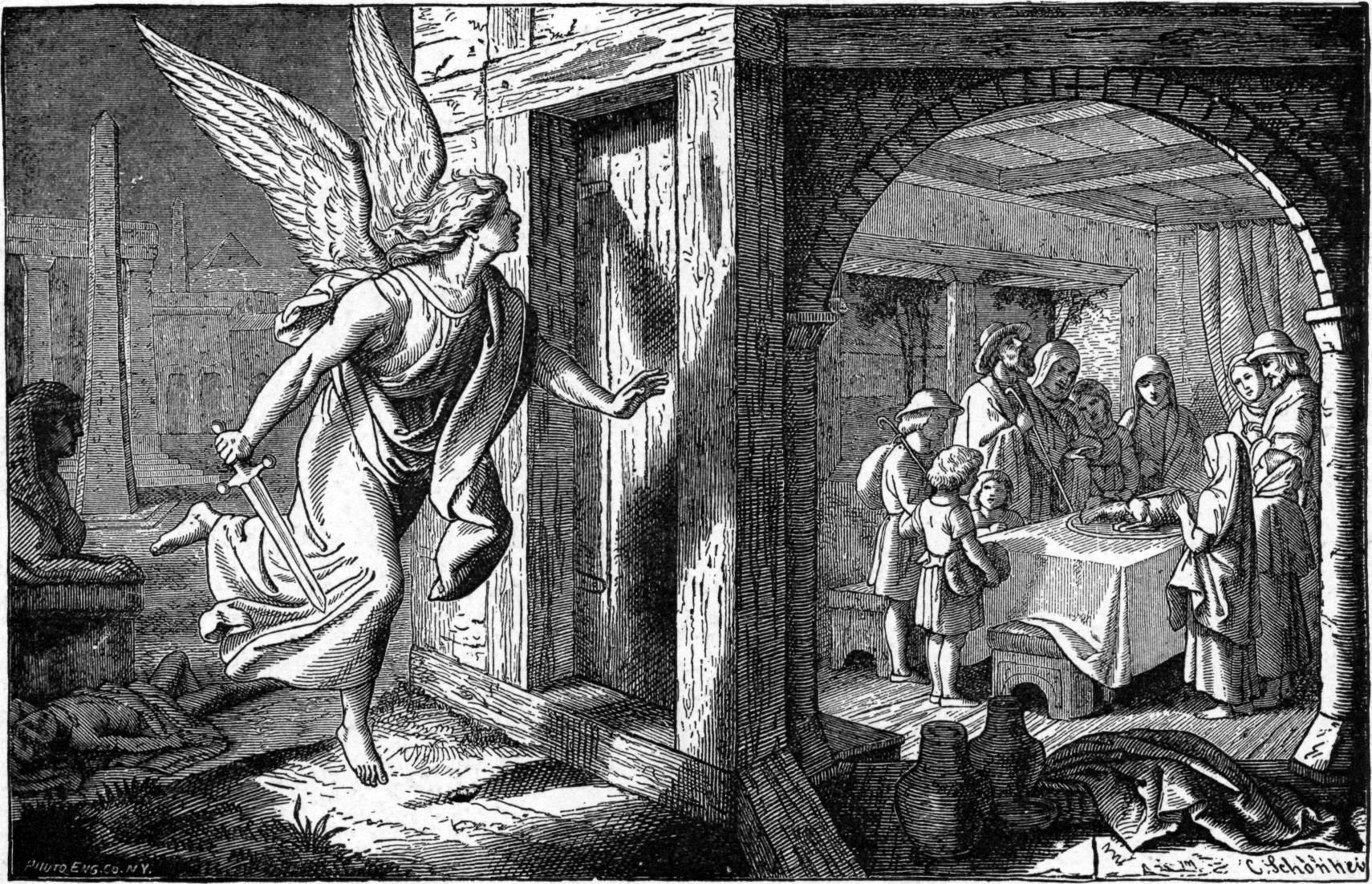
The Angel of Death and the First Passover (illustration from the 1897 Bible Pictures and What They Teach Us by Charles Foster)

In the Mishnah, the House of Shammai and the House of Hillel disagreed about how far one should recite into the Hallel, Psalms 113–118. The House of Shammai maintained that one recited until the words "as a joyous mother of children" in Psalm 113:9, while the House of Hillel said that one recited until the words "the flint into a fountain of waters" in Psalm 114:8. The Tosefta and the Jerusalem Talmud reported that the House of Shammai argued to the House of Hillel that since the original Passover meal in Egypt preceded the Exodus, it would be inappropriate at a Passover seder to give thanks for the Exodus. The House of Hillel argued to the House of Shammai that since the Israelites only left Egypt at midday (for which the Jerusalem Talmud cited Exodus 12:51, which it read to say, "And it came to pass in the middle of that day"), it would still be inappropriate to mention the Exodus on the morning after the seder. The Jerusalem Talmud reported that the House of Hillel concluded that once one has started a religious duty, one should finish it. And Rabbi Abuna bar Sehorah questioned the argument of the House of Shammai, as one will already have mentioned the Exodus from Egypt in the Sanctification blessing said over a cup at the seder's beginning.

The Mishnah taught that one concluded with a blessing of redemption. Rabbi Tarfon used to say (that the blessing included), "who redeemed us and redeemed our fathers from Egypt," but one did not conclude with a blessing. Rabbi Akiva said (that one added to Rabbi Tarfon's version the following), "So may the Lord our God and the God of our fathers allow us to reach other seasons and festivals in peace, rejoicing in the rebuilding of Your city and glad in Your service, and there we will eat the sacrifices and the Passover-offerings . . . ," (and one proceeded) as far as, "Blessed are You, o Lord, who have redeemed Israel."

The Mishnah continued that they filled the third cup of wine. The leader then recited the Grace After Meals. Over the fourth cup, the leader concluded the Hallel, and recited the grace of song. Between the first, second, and third cups, one could drink if one wished, but between the third and the fourth cups one was not permitted to drink.

One may not conclude the Passover meal with dainties. If some of the party fell asleep, they could eat when they awoke, but if all fell asleep, they were not permitted to eat. Rabbi Jose said that if they slept only lightly, they could eat, but if they fell fast asleep, they were not permitted to eat.

Rabban Gamaliel once reclined at a Passover seder at the house of Boethus ben Zeno in Lud, and they discussed the laws of the Passover all night until the cock crowed. Then they raised the table, stretched, and went to the house of study.

The Mishnah noted differences between the first Passover in Exodus 12:3–27, 43–49; 13:6–10; 23:15; 34:25; Leviticus 23:4–8; Numbers 9:1–14; 28:16–25; and Deuteronomy 16:1–8. and the second Passover in Numbers 9:9–13. The Mishnah taught that the prohibitions of Exodus 12:19 that "seven days shall there be no leaven found in your houses" and of Exodus 13:7 that "no leaven shall be seen in all your territory" applied to the first Passover; while at the second Passover, one could have both leavened and unleavened bread in one's house. And the Mishnah taught that for the first Passover, one was required to recite the Hallel (Psalms 113–118) when the Passover lamb was eaten; while the second Passover did not require the reciting of Hallel when the Passover lamb was eaten. But both the first and second Passovers required the reciting of Hallel when the Passover lambs were offered, and both Passover lambs were eaten roasted with unleavened bread (מַצָּה, matzah) and bitter herbs. And both the first and second Passovers took precedence over the Sabbath.

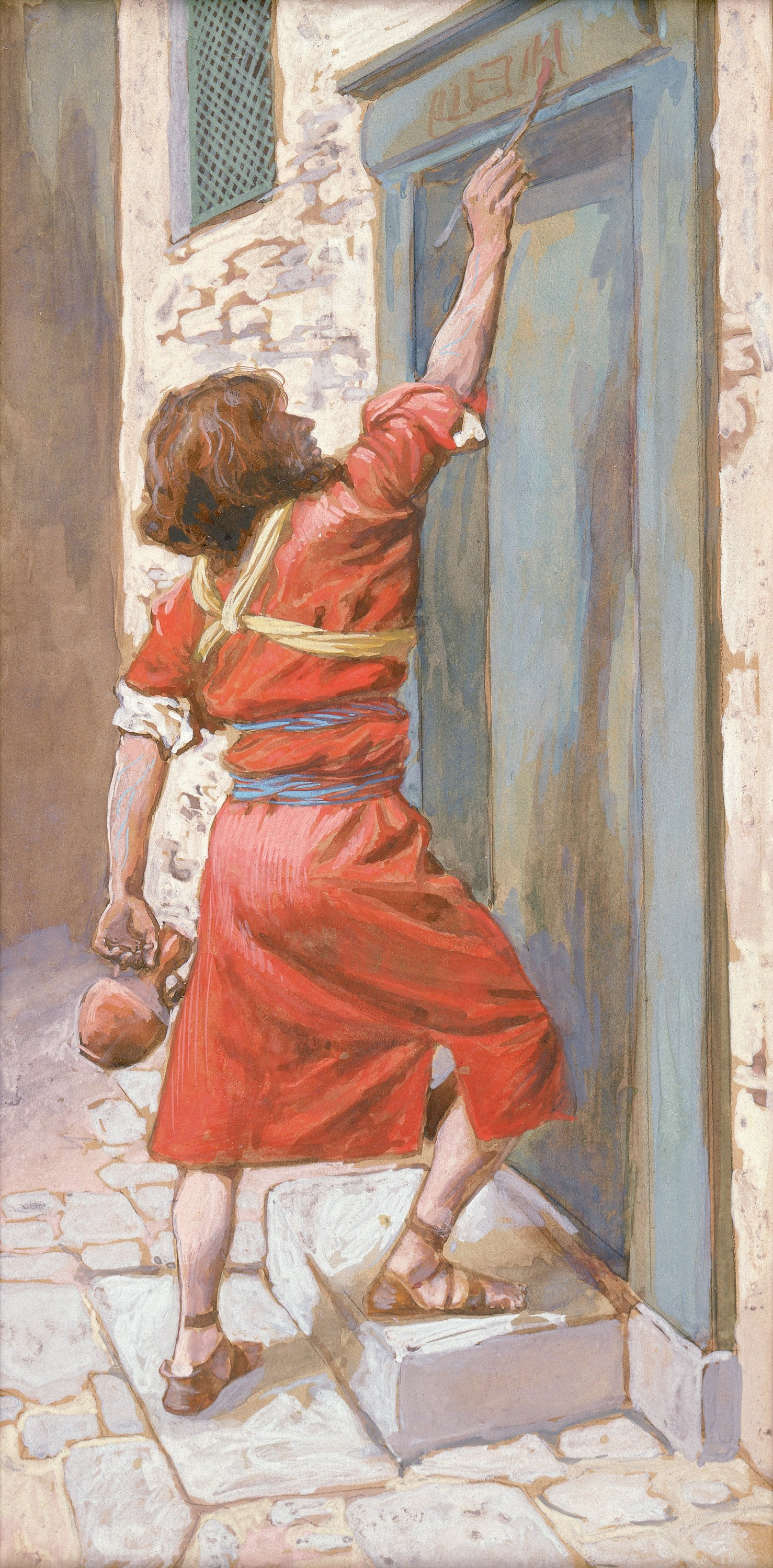
The Signs on the Door (watercolor circa 1896–1902 by James Tissot)

A midrash interpreted the words of Exodus 8:22, "Lo, if we sacrifice the abomination of the Egyptians before their eyes, will they not stone us?" to teach that the Egyptians saw the lamb as a god. Thus, when God told Moses to slay the paschal lamb (as reflected in Exodus 12:21), Moses asked God how he could possibly do so, when the lamb was as Egyptian god. God replied that the Israelites would not depart from Egypt until they slaughtered the Egyptian gods before the Egyptians' eyes, so that God might teach them that their gods were really nothing at all. And thus, God did so, for on the same night that God slew the Egyptian firstborn, the Israelites slaughtered their paschal lambs and ate them. When the Egyptians saw their firstborn slain and their gods slaughtered, they could do nothing, as Numbers 33:4 reports, "While the Egyptians were burying them whom the Lord had smitten among them, even all their firstborn; upon their gods also the Lord executed judgment."

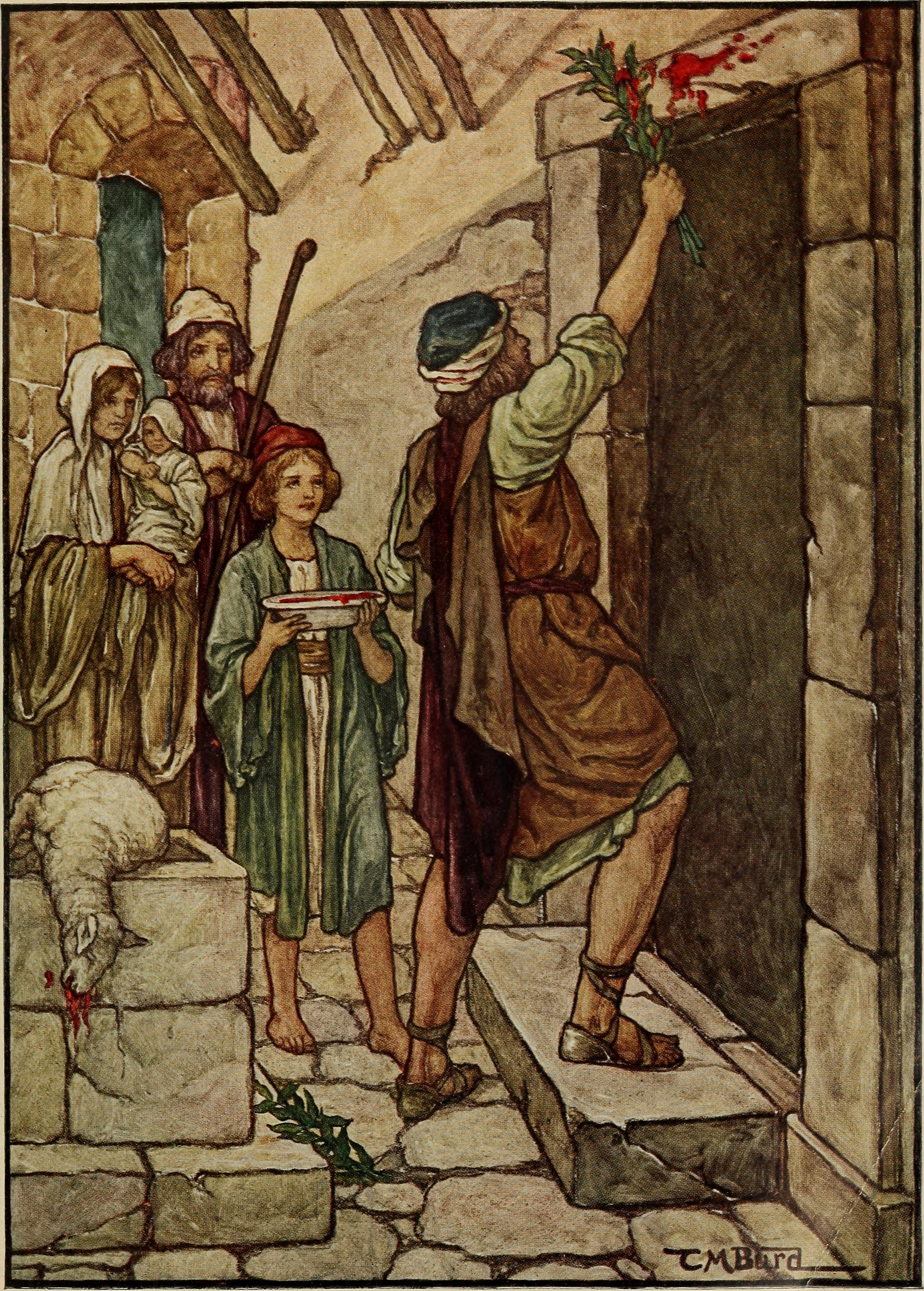
Preparing for the Passing Over of the Angel of Death (illustration from the 1911 book With the children on Sundays, through eye-gate and ear-gate into the city of child-soul, by Sylvanus Stall)

A midrash noted that God commanded the Israelites to perform certain precepts with similar material from trees: God commanded that the Israelites throw cedar wood and hyssop into the Red Heifer mixture of Numbers 19:6 and use hyssop to sprinkle the resulting waters of lustration in Numbers 19:18; God commanded that the Israelites use cedar wood and hyssop to purify those stricken with skin disease in Leviticus 14:4–6; and in Egypt God commanded the Israelites to use the bunch of hyssop to strike the lintel and the two side-posts with blood in Exodus 12:22.

The midrash noted that many things appear lowly, but God commanded many precepts to be performed with them. The hyssop, for instance, appears to be of no worth to people, yet its power is great in the eyes of God, who put it on a level with cedar in the purification of the leper in Leviticus 14:4–6 and the burning of the Red Cow in Numbers 19:6, 18, and employed it in the Exodus from Egypt in Exodus 12:22.

A midrash taught that the words of Song of Songs 2:13, "The fig-trees put forth her green figs," refer to the sinners of Israel who died in the three days of darkness, as Exodus 10:22–23 says, "And there was a thick darkness . . . they saw not one another."

The Mishnah described the appropriate hyssop for ceremonial use as a bunch containing three stalks bearing three buds. Rabbi Judah said three stalks bearing three buds each.

Reading Exodus 21:6, regarding the Hebrew servant who chose not to go free and whose master brought him to the doorpost and bore his ear through with an awl, Rabbi Simeon bar Rabbi explained that God singled out the doorpost from all other parts of the house because the doorpost was witness in Egypt when God passed over the lintel and the doorposts (as reported in Exodus 12) and proclaimed (in the words of Leviticus 25:55), "For to me the children of Israel are servants, they are my servants," and not servants of servants, and so God brought them forth from bondage to freedom, yet this servant acquired a master for himself.

Rav Joseph interpreted the words of Exodus 12:22, "And none of you shall go out at the door of his house until the morning," to teach that once God has granted permission to the Destroyer, he does not distinguish between righteous and wicked. Moreover, he even begins with the righteous at the outset, as Ezekiel 21:8 says, "And I will cut off from you the righteous and the wicked" (mentioning the righteous first). Rav Joseph wept at this, but Abaye consoled him, saying that this is for their advantage, as Isaiah 57:1 says, "That the righteous is taken away from the evil to come."

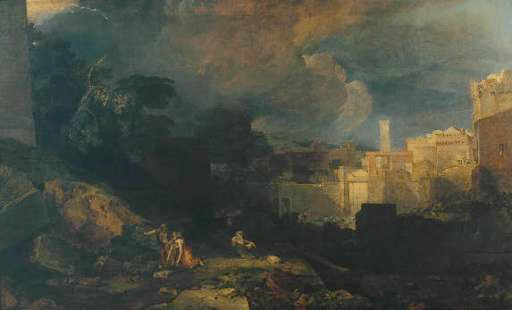
The Plague of the Firstborn (1802 painting by J. M. W. Turner)

Reading Exodus 12:23, "For the Lord will pass through to smite the Egyptians," a midrash observed that some say that God acted through the medium of an angel ("the Destroyer," הַמַּשְׁחִית, ha-mashchit), while others said that God acted on God's own.

A midrash deduced from Exodus 12:23, "And the Lord will pass over the door," that God was at the door at that time. The midrash thus questioned why Exodus 12:23 says, "And when He sees the blood upon the lintel." The midrash explained that this followed the usual practice, just as a butcher marks with red paint those sheep destined for slaughter to distinguish them from those that the butcher wishes to keep alive. So the midrash told that God stood at the door and thrust away the Destroyer so that he should not smite the Israelites.

The Mekhilta of Rabbi Ishmael interpreted the words "the firstborn of Pharaoh who sat on his throne" in Exodus 12:29 to teach that Pharaoh himself was a firstborn, as well. And the Mekhilta of Rabbi Ishmael taught that God preserved him as the only firstborn of Egypt to survive the plague.

The Mekhilta of Rabbi Ishmael asked how the captives had sinned that God struck their firstborn, as Exodus 12:29 reports. The Mekhilta of Rabbi Ishmael explained that God struck them so that they should not say that their god brought this punishment on the Egyptians but not on them. Alternatively, the Mekhilta of Rabbi Ishmael told that God struck them because the captives used to rejoice over every decree that Pharaoh decreed against the Israelites. And the Mekhilta of Rabbi Ishmael taught that the Egyptian servants did so, as well, thus explaining why God said in Exodus 11:5 that God would strike the firstborn of the maidservant who was behind the mill.

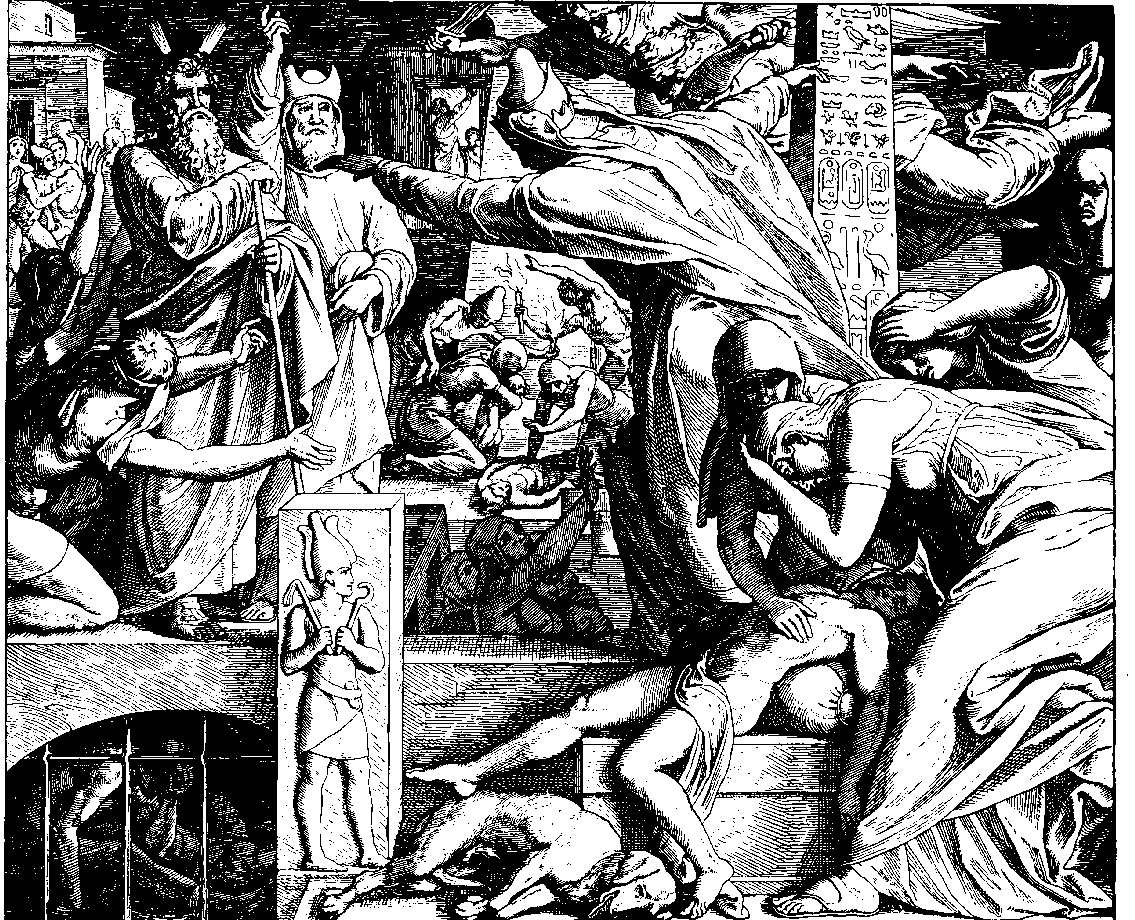
Pharaoh Urges Moses and Aaron to Depart (woodcut by Julius Schnorr von Carolsfeld from the 1860 Die Bibel in Bildern)

Reading the report of Exodus 12:30 that "there was not a house where there was not one dead," Rabbi Nathan asked whether there were no houses without firstborn. The Mekhilta of Rabbi Ishmael explained that when an Egyptian firstborn would die, the parents would set up a statue of the firstborn in the house. The Mekhilta of Rabbi Ishmael further taught that on the night of the plague of the firstborn, God crushed, ground, and scattered those statues as well, and the parents grieved anew as though they had just buried their firstborn.

The Mekhilta of Rabbi Ishmael interpreted the words "and he called for Moses and Aaron" in Exodus 12:31 to teach that Pharaoh went around the land of Egypt asking everyone where Moses and Aaron lived.

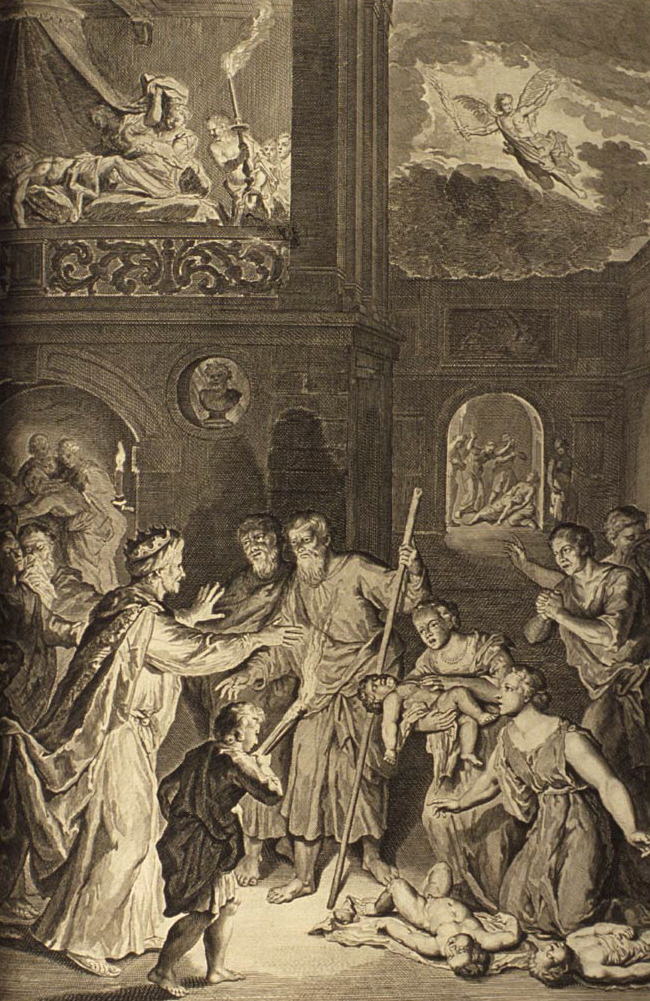
The Egyptian Firstborn Destroyed (illustration from the 1728 Figures de la Bible)

The Mekhilta of Rabbi Ishmael explained that the Egyptians said, "We are all dead men," in Exodus 12:33 because in many families, many sons died. The Egyptian men had thought that a man who had four or five sons would have lost only the eldest, in accord with the warning of Moses in Exodus 11:5 that "the firstborn in the land of Egypt shall die." But they did not know, told the Mekhilta of Rabbi Ishmael, that all their sons were the firstborn sons of different bachelors with whom their wives had committed adultery. God exposed the women's adultery, and all of the sons died. The Mekhilta of Rabbi Ishmael taught that if God makes public evil, which is of lesser importance, how much more will God reward good, which is of greater importance.

Rabbi Ammi read the words of Exodus 12:36, "And they let them have what they asked," to teach that the Egyptians let the Israelites have their goods against their will. Some said that it was against the Egyptians' will, while others said that it was against the Israelites' will. Those who said that it was against the Egyptians' will cite Psalm 68:13, "And she who waits at home divides the spoil." Those who said that it was against the Israelites' will said that it was because of the burden of carrying the Egyptians' goods. Rabbi Ammi read the words of Exodus 12:36, "And they despoiled Egypt," to teach that they made Egypt like a trap for birds without any grain (as a lure). Resh Lakish said that they made Egypt it like a pond without fish.

Rav Judah in the name of Samuel of Nehardea deduced from Genesis 47:14 that Joseph gathered in and brought to Egypt all the gold and silver in the world. The Gemara noted that Genesis 47:14 says: "And Joseph gathered up all the money that was found in the land of Egypt, and in the land of Canaan," and thus spoke about the wealth of only Egypt and Canaan. The Gemara found support for the proposition that Joseph collected the wealth of other countries from Genesis 41:57, which states: "And all the countries came to Egypt to Joseph to buy corn." The Gemara deduced from the words "and they despoiled the Egyptians" in Exodus 12:36 that when the Israelites left Egypt, they carried that wealth away with them. The Gemara then taught that the wealth lay in Israel until the time of King Rehoboam, when King Shishak of Egypt seized it from Rehoboam, as 1 Kings 14:25–26 reports: "And it came to pass in the fifth year of king Rehoboam, that Shishak king of Egypt came up against Jerusalem; and he took away the treasures of the house of the Lord, and the treasures of the king's house."

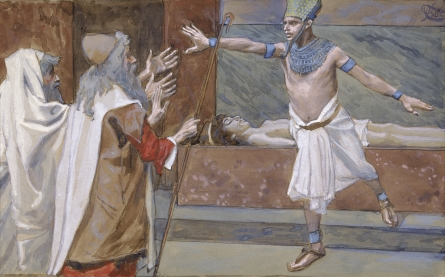
Pharaoh and His Dead Son (watercolor circa 1896–1902 by James Tissot)

Similarly, reading God's words in Exodus 25:2, "accept gifts for Me from every person whose heart so moves him," the Mekhilta of Rabbi Simeon deduced that each and every Israelite was so rich from having stripped the Egyptians—as reported in Exodus 12:36—that each Israelite had the wherewithal to erect the Tent of Meeting, with all its vessels, all of its golden hooks, boards, wooden bars, columns, and pedestals.

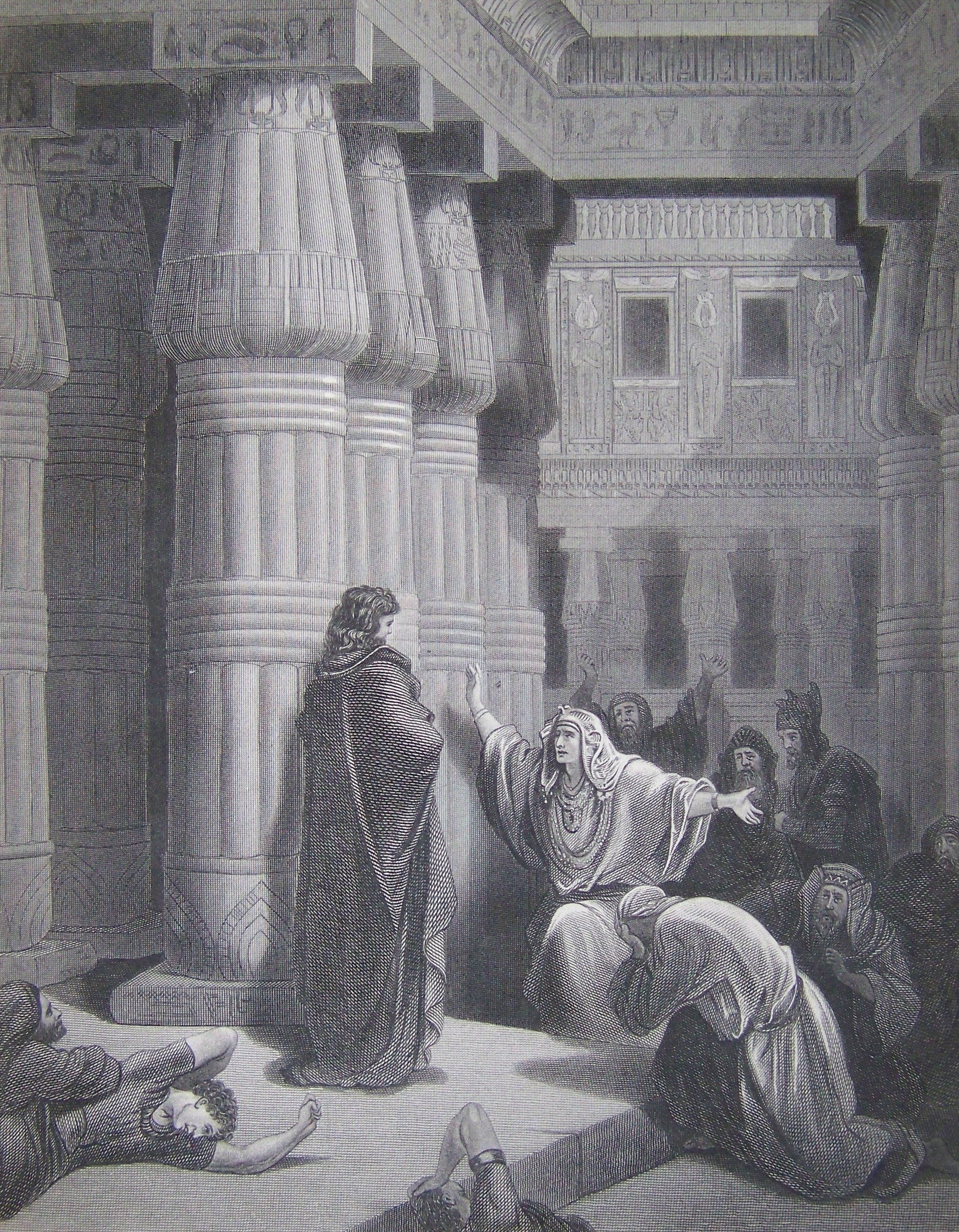
The Egyptians Urging Moses To Depart (illustration from the 1890 Holman Bible)

A baraita taught that in the time of Alexander the Great, the Egyptians summoned the Israelites before Alexander, demanding from them the gold and silver that Exodus 12:36 reported that the Israelites had borrowed from the Egyptians. The sages granted Gebiah ben Pesisa permission to be Israel's advocate. Gebiah asked the Egyptians what the evidence was for their claim, and the Egyptians answered that the Torah provided their evidence. Then Gebiah said that he would also bring evidence from the Torah in Israel's defense. He quoted Exodus 12:40 and demanded back wages from the Egyptians for the labor of 600,000 Israelite men whom the Egyptians had compelled to work for them for 430 years. Alexander turned to the Egyptians for a proper answer. The Egyptians requested three days' time, but could not find a satisfactory answer, and they fled.

Rabbi Eliezer interpreted the words "the children of Israel journeyed from Rameses to sukkot" in Exodus 12:37 to mean that the Israelites went to a place where they put up booths, sukkot. Other Sages said that Succot was simply the name of a place, as in Numbers 33:6. Rabbi Akiva taught that Succot in Exodus 12:37 means the clouds of glory, as in Isaiah 4:5.

The Exodus (watercolor circa 1896–1902 by James Tissot)

A midrash taught that the Israelites were counted on ten occasions: (1) when they went down to Egypt (Deuteronomy 10:22); (2) when they went up out of Egypt (Exodus 12:37); (3) at the first census in Numbers (Numbers 1:1–46); (4) at the second census in Numbers (Numbers 26:1–65); (5) once for the banners; (6) once in the time of Joshua for the division of the Land of Israel; (7) once by Saul (1 Samuel 11:8); (8) a second time by Saul (1 Samuel 15:4); (9) once by David (2 Samuel 24:9); and once in the time of Ezra (Ezra 2:64).

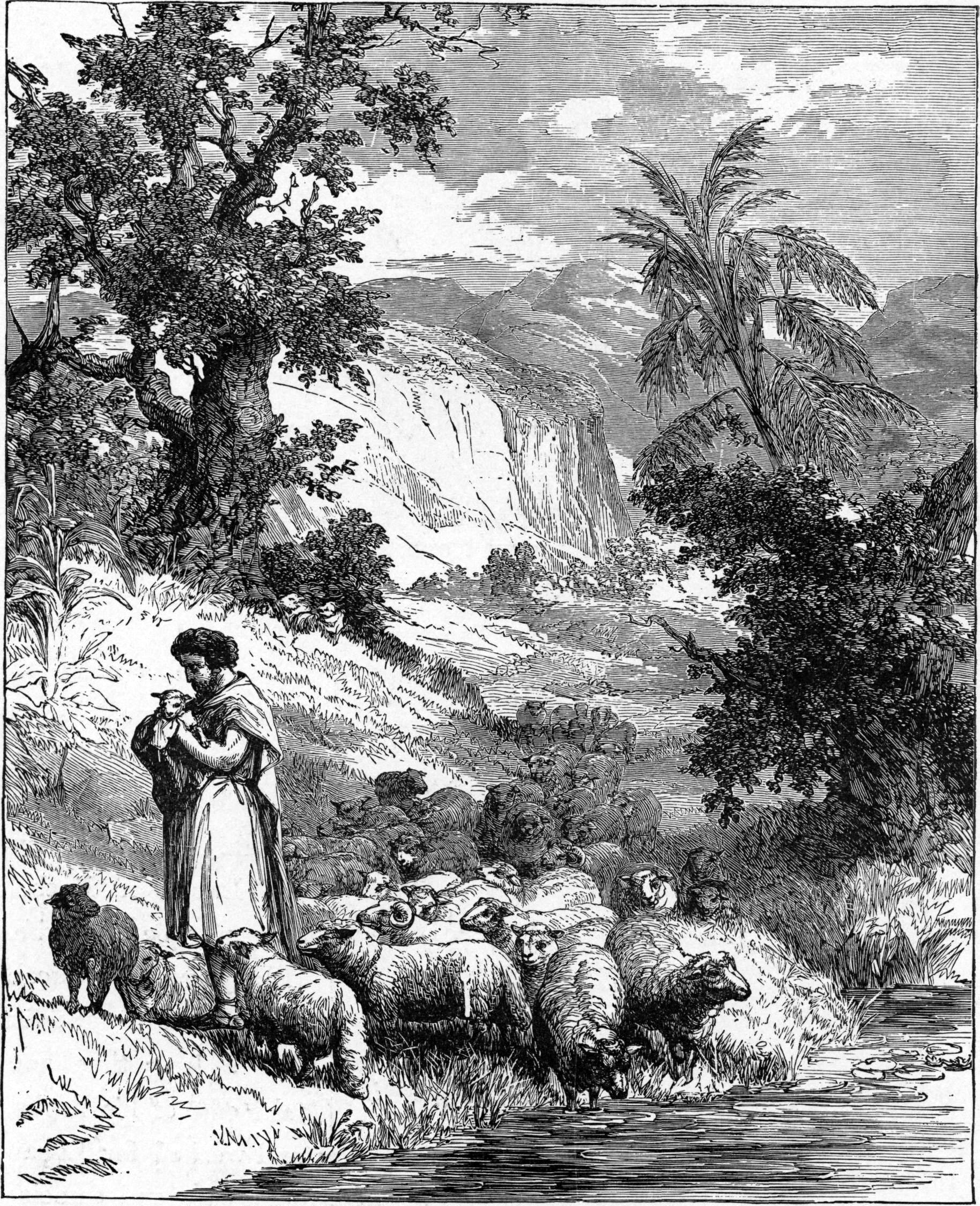
A Shepherd (illustration from the 1897 Bible Pictures and What They Teach Us by Charles Foster)

A midrash explained that Moses numbered the Israelites like a shepherd to whom an owner entrusted a flock by number. When the shepherd came to the end of the shepherd's time, on returning them, the shepherd had to count them again. When Israel left Egypt, God entrusted the Israelites to Moses by number, as Numbers 1:1 reports, "And the Lord spoke to Moses in the wilderness of Sinai . . . 'Take the sum of all the congregation of the children of Israel.'" And Exodus 12:37 records that "the children of Israel journeyed from Rameses to Succoth, about 600,000 men on foot," demonstrating that Moses took responsibility for the Israelites in Egypt by number. When, therefore, Moses was about to depart from the world in the plain of Moab, he returned them to God by number after having them counted in the census reported at Numbers 26:1–51.

The Mekhilta of Rabbi Ishmael interpreted the account of unleavened cakes of dough in Exodus 12:39 to teach that the Israelites had kneaded the dough but did not have sufficient time to let it leaven before they were redeemed.

A baraita taught that King Ptolemy brought together 72 elders and placed them in 72 separate rooms, without telling them why he had brought them together, and asked each of them to translate the Torah. God then prompted each of the elders to conceive the same idea and not to follow the Masoretic Text in their translation in several cases, including Exodus 12:40, "And the abode of the children of Israel which they stayed in Egypt and in other lands was 400 years." The translation of the 72 elders inserted the words "and in other lands," because, according to the Biblical record, the Israelites were in Egypt at most 210 years.

A baraita taught that when Moses broke the stone tablets in Exodus 32:19, it was one of three actions that Moses took based on his own understanding with which God then agreed. The Gemara explained that Moses reasoned that if the Passover lamb, which was just one of the 613 commandments, was prohibited by Exodus 12:43 to aliens, then certainly the whole Torah should be prohibited to the Israelites, who had acted as apostates with the Golden Calf. The Gemara deduced God's approval from God's mention of Moses' breaking the tablets in Exodus 34:1. Resh Lakish interpreted this to mean that God gave Moses strength because he broke the tablets.

Reading the prohibition of non-Jews eating the Passover sacrifice in Exodus 12:43 and 48, the Gemara told the tale of a certain Syrian non-Jew who used to eat of the Passover sacrifices in Jerusalem, boasting that Exodus 12:43 says, "There shall no alien eat thereof," and Exodus 12:48 says, "No uncircumcised person shall eat thereof," yet he ate of the very best. Rabbi Judah ben Bathyra asked him whether he had ever eaten of the fat tail, and the Syrian replied that he had not. So Rabbi Judah ben Bathyra told the Syrian that the next time he went to Jerusalem for Passover, he should ask them to give him the fat tail. So when the Syrian went up, he asked them for the fat-tail. They answered him that the fat-tail belongs to God (and is burnt on the altar) and asked him who told him to ask for it. The Syrian told them that Rabbi Judah ben Bathyra had done so. Their suspicions aroused, they investigated who the Syrian was, discovered that he was not a Jew, and killed him. Then they sent a message to Rabbi Judah ben Bathyra saying that he was in Nisibis (in northern Mesopotamia), yet his net was spread in Jerusalem.

A midrash asked how to reconcile the command of Exodus 12:43, "And the Lord said to Moses and Aaron: 'This is the ordinance of the Passover: No alien shall eat thereof," with the admonition of Isaiah 56:3, "Neither let the alien who has joined himself to the Lord speak, saying: 'The Lord will surely separate me from his people.'" (Isaiah enjoins us to treat the convert the same as a native Israelite.) The midrash quoted Job 31:32, in which Job said, "The stranger did not lodge in the street" (that is, none were denied hospitality), to show that God disqualifies no one, but receives all; the city gates were open all the time and anyone could enter them. The midrash equated Job 31:32, "The stranger did not lodge in the street," with the words of Exodus 20:10, Deuteronomy 5:14, and Deuteronomy 31:12, "And your stranger who is within your gates," which imply that strangers were integrated into the community. Thus, these verses reflect the Divine example of accepting all. Rabbi Berekiah explained that in Job 31:32, Job said, "The stranger did not lodge in the street," because strangers will one day be ministering priests in the Temple, as Isaiah 14:1 says: "And the stranger shall join himself with them, and they shall cleave (וְנִסְפְּחוּ, venispechu) to the house of Jacob," and the word "cleave" (וְנִסְפְּחוּ, venispechu) always refers to priesthood, as 1 Samuel 2:36 says, "Put me (סְפָחֵנִי, sefacheini), I pray you, into one of the priests' offices." The midrash taught that strangers will one day partake of the showbread, because their daughters will be married into the priesthood. The midrash reported another interpretation of Isaiah 56:3, "Neither let the alien, who has joined himself to the Lord, speak, saying: 'The Lord will surely separate me from his people'": In this interpretation, God addressed converts to Judaism, assuring them that they are not barred from Passover celebrations, noting that converts might have misgivings, because God disqualified aliens from the Passover celebration by commanding in Exodus 12:43, "No alien shall eat thereof." The midrash taught that God admonished converts to mark how kindly God treated the Gibeonites, even though they deceived the Israelites into swearing to preserve them in Joshua 9:3–15. The midrash taught that if God allowed them satisfaction for their wrongs in 2 Samuel 21:8–9, how much more would God receive favorably and promote the proselytes who come to serve God out of sheer love. Hence Isaiah 56:3, says: "Neither let the alien, who has joined himself to the Lord, speak, saying: 'The Lord will surely separate me from his people.'" And converts can certainly celebrate the Paschal offering.

Noting that Exodus 12:43, "This is the ordinance (חֻקַּת, chukat) of the Passover," uses the same term as Numbers 19:2, "This is the statute (חֻקַּת, chukat) of the Law," a midrash found the statute of the Passover and the statute of the Red Heifer like one another. The midrash taught that Psalm 119:80, "Let my heart be undivided in your statutes," refers to this similarity, and asked which statute is greater than the other. The midrash likened this to the case of two ladies who were walking side by side together apparently on an equal footing; who then is the greater? She whom her friend accompanies to her house and so is really being followed by the friend. The midrash concluded that the law of the Red Cow is the greater, for those who eat the Passover need the Red Cow's purifying ashes, as Numbers 19:17 says, "And for the unclean they shall take of the ashes of the burning of the purification from sin."

The Mekhilta of Rabbi Ishmael asked why Exodus 12:49 directed that there be one law for both the native and the stranger who sojourns among us when Exodus 12:48 had just enjoined that the stranger be treated as one who is born in the land. The Mekhilta of Rabbi Ishmael concluded that Exodus 12:49 comes to declare that the convert is equal to the born Jew with respect to all the Torah's commandments.

The Pirke de-Rabbi Eliezer read Exodus 12:51 to say, "And it came to pass at the essential part of the day, that the Lord did bring the children of Israel out of the land of Egypt by their hosts." The Pirke de-Rabbi Eliezer taught that God thought that if God brought the Israelites out by night, the Egyptians would say that God acted like a thief. Therefore, God decided to bring the Israelites out when the sun was at its zenith at midday.

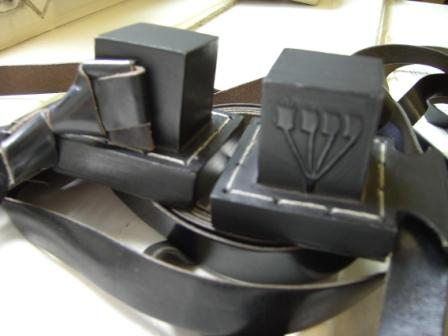
Tefillin

=== Exodus chapter 13 ===
The Mishnah taught that the absence of one of the four portions of scripture in the Tefillin—Exodus 13:1–10 and 11–16 and Deuteronomy 6:4–8 and 11:13–21—invalidates the others, and indeed even one imperfect letter can invalidate the whole.

Tractate Bekhorot in the Mishnah, Tosefta, and Talmud interpreted the laws of the firstborn in Exodus 13:1–2, 12–13; 22:28–29; and 34:19–20; and Numbers 3:13 and 8:17. Elsewhere, the Mishnah drew from Exodus 13:13 that money in exchange for a firstborn donkey could be given to any Kohen; that if a person weaves the hair of a firstborn donkey into a sack, the sack must be burned; that they did not redeem with the firstborn of a donkey an animal that falls within both wild and domestic categories (a koy); and that one was prohibited to derive benefit in any quantity at all from an unredeemed firstborn donkey. And elsewhere, the Mishnah taught that before the Israelites constructed the Tabernacle, the firstborns performed sacrificial services, but after the Israelites constructed the Tabernacle, the priests (כֹּהֲנִים, Kohanim) performed the services.

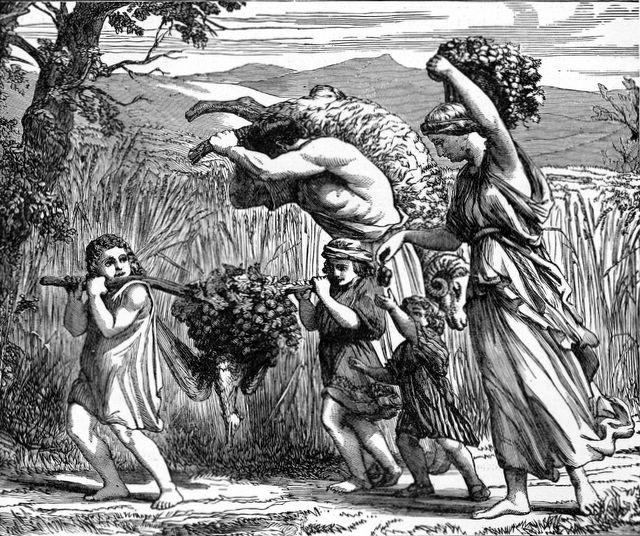
A Land Flowing with Milk and Honey (illustration from Henry Davenport Northrop's 1894 Treasures of the Bible)

The Gemara reported a number of Rabbis' reports of how the Land of Israel did indeed flow with "milk and honey," as described in Exodus 3:8 and 17, 13:5, and 33:3, Leviticus 20:24, Numbers 13:27 and 14:8, and Deuteronomy 6:3, 11:9, 26:9 and 15, 27:3, and 31:20. Once when Rami bar Ezekiel visited Bnei Brak, he saw goats grazing under fig trees while honey was flowing from the figs, and milk dripped from the goats mingling with the fig honey, causing him to remark that it was indeed a land flowing with milk and honey. Rabbi Jacob ben Dostai said that it is about three miles from Lod to Ono, and once he rose up early in the morning and waded all that way up to his ankles in fig honey. Resh Lakish said that he saw the flow of the milk and honey of Sepphoris extend over an area of sixteen miles by sixteen miles. Rabbah bar Bar Hana said that he saw the flow of the milk and honey in all the Land of Israel and the total area was equal to an area of twenty-two parasangs by six parasangs.

Rabban Gamaliel taught that in every generation, all are duty bound to regard it as if they personally had gone forth from Egypt, as Exodus 13:8 says, "And you shall tell your son in that day saying, it is because of that which the Lord did for me when I came forth out of Egypt."

Reading Exodus 13:13, "And every firstborn of a donkey you shall redeem with a lamb," and Exodus 34:20, "and the firstborn of a donkey you shall redeem with a lamb," the Mishnah noted that the Torah states this law twice, and deduced that one is therefore not obligated under this law unless both the animal that gives birth is a donkey and the animal born is a donkey. The Mishnah thus concluded that a cow that gave birth to a calf like a donkey and a donkey that gave birth to a foal like a horse are exempt from their offspring being considered a firstborn.

== In medieval Jewish interpretation ==
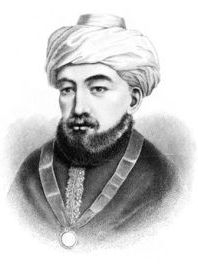
Maimonides

The parashah is discussed in these medieval Jewish sources:

=== Exodus chapter 10 ===
Reading God's command to Moses in Exodus 10:1, "Go in to Pharaoh; for I have hardened his heart, and the heart of his servants," and similar statements in Exodus 4:21; 7:3, 9:12 10:20, 27; 11:10; and 14:4, 8, and 17, Maimonides concluded that it is possible for a person to commit such a great sin, or so many sins, that God decrees that the punishment for these willing and knowing acts is the removal of the privilege of repentance (teshuvah). The offender would thus be prevented from doing repentance and would not have the power to return from the offense, and the offender would die and be lost because of the offense. Maimonides read this to be what God said in Isaiah 6:10, "Make the heart of this people fat, and make their ears heavy, and their eyes weak, lest they see with their eyes and hear with their ears, and their hearts will understand, do repentance and be healed." Similarly, 2 Chronicles 36:16 reports, "They ridiculed the messengers of God, disdained His words and insulted His prophets until the anger of God rose upon the people, without possibility of healing." Maimonides interpreted these verses to teach that they sinned willingly and to such an egregious extent that they deserved to have repentance withheld from them. Because Pharaoh sinned on his own at the beginning, harming the Jews who lived in his land, as Exodus 1:10 reports him scheming, "Let us deal craftily with them," God issued the judgment that repentance would be withheld from Pharaoh until he received his punishment. Therefore, God said in Exodus 14:4, "I will harden the heart of Pharaoh." Maimonides explained that God sent Moses to tell Pharaoh to send out the Jews and do repentance, when God had already told Moses that Pharaoh would refuse, because God sought to inform humanity that when God withholds repentance from a sinner, the sinner will not be able to repent. Maimonides made clear that God did not decree that Pharaoh harm the Jewish people; rather, Pharaoh sinned willfully on his own, and he thus deserved to have the privilege of repentance withheld from him.

According to Hezekiah ben Manoah (Hizkuni), Pharaoh's courtiers in Exodus 10:7 "questioned Pharaoh's judgment by asking him if he wanted to wait until the whole of Egypt was ruined? They implied that if Egypt were to be ruined, in the end Pharaoh would have no option but to give in to the Israelites' demands. Why not give in while Egypt was still a functioning nation?"

Reading Exodus 10:9, "Moses said: 'We will go with our young and with our old,'" the Lekach Tov taught that Moses told Pharaoh that just as all had been in Pharaoh's service, so would all be in God's service.

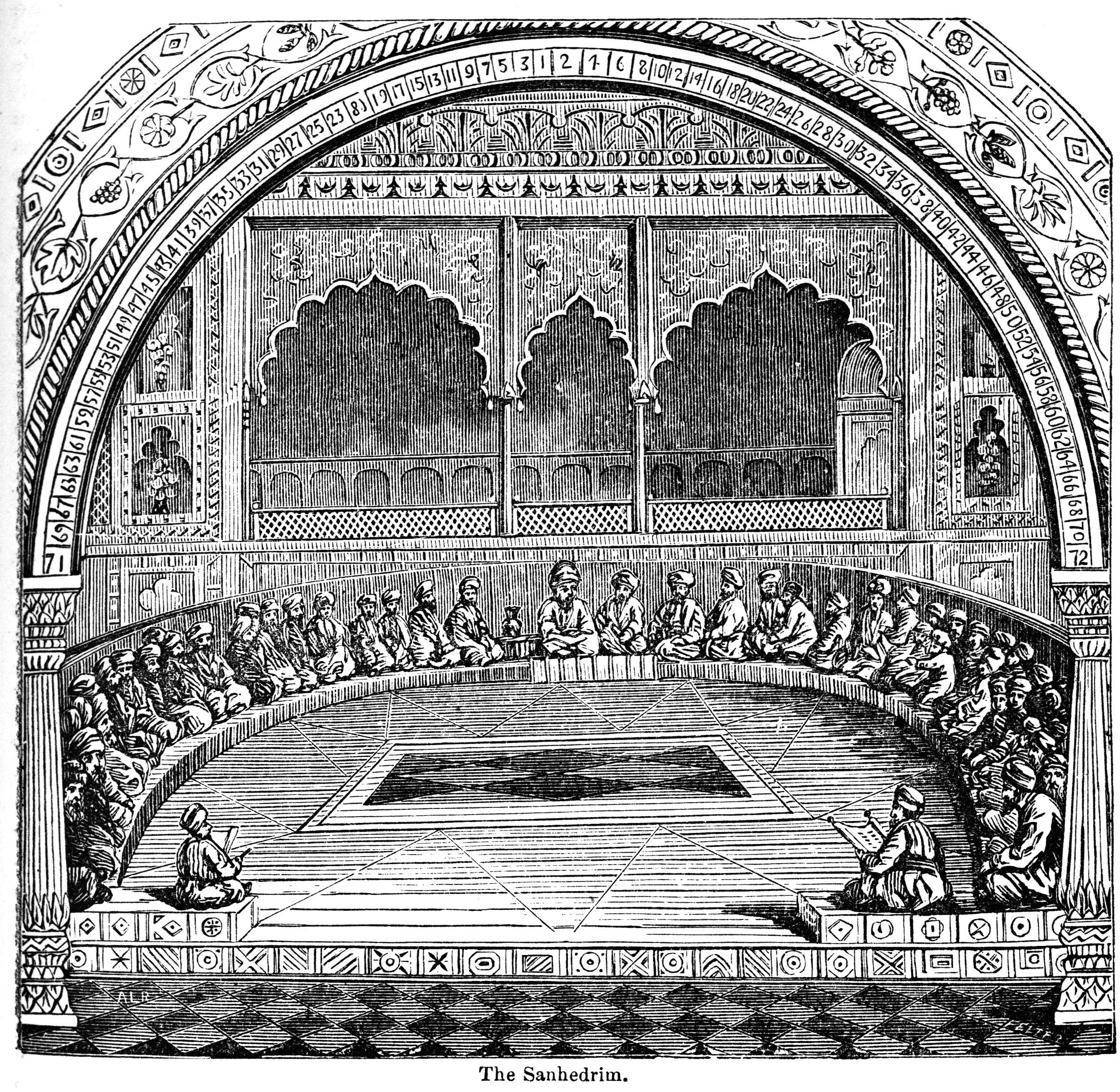
The Sanhedrin (illustration from the 1883 People's Cyclopedia of Universal Knowledge)

=== Exodus chapter 12 ===
Maimonides taught that the prerogative to sanctify the New Moon at its sighting and to set a leap year to reconcile the calendar applied to the Sanhedrin in the Land of Israel. Maimonides taught that this was derived from the command given Moses and Aaron in Exodus 12:2, "This month shall be for you the first of months," which Maimonides reported the Oral Tradition interpreted to mean that this testimony was entrusted to Moses and Aaron and those sages who arose after them who functioned in their position. When the Sanhedrin ended in the Land of Israel, Jews established the monthly calendar and instituted leap years solely according to the fixed calendar that is followed now. So the sighting of the moon is no longer of any consequence.

According to Maimonides, Passover is kept seven days, because a week is the intermediate unit of time between a day and a month. Passover teaches people to remember the miracles that God performed in Egypt, encouraging people to thank God repeatedly and to lead a modest and humble life. Jews therefore eat unleavened bread and bitter herbs on Passover in memory of what happened to the Israelites. And they eat unleavened bread for a week because if the eating were only for one day, Jews might not notice it.

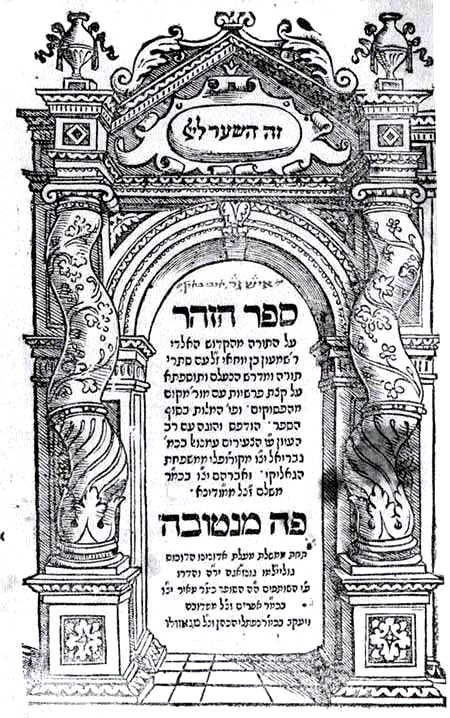
The first page of the Zohar

The Zohar taught that on the night of the Exodus, there were three slayings in Egypt. First, the firstborn killed whomever they could lay hands on. Then, God executed judgment at midnight. And lastly, Pharaoh, on seeing the havoc wrought upon his own household, arose, as Exodus 12:30 says, "He rose up at midnight," and with bitterness and fury he killed the princes and nobles who had advised him to persecute Israel, just as a dog, if hit with a stone, goes and bites another dog.

Reading Exodus 12:34, "And the people took their dough before it was leavened," the Zohar taught that "leaven" and "unleaven" symbolize the evil inclination (יֵצֶר רַע, yeitzer ra) and the good inclination in people. The Zohar taught that one who fervently and joyously relates the story of the Exodus on Passover, telling the story with a high heart, shall be found worthy to rejoice in the Divine Presence (Shekhinah) in the World To Come. The Zohar taught that the joy of Israel causes God to be glad, so that God calls together all the family above and to hear the praises that God's children bring to God. Then all the angels and supernal beings gather around and observe Israel singing and rejoicing because of God's Redemption and the supernal beings also break into jubilation because God possesses on earth a people so holy, whose joy in God's Redemption is so great and so powerful. And the Zohar taught that the rejoicing on Earth below increases the power of God and God's hosts in the regions above, just as an earthly king gains strength from the praises of his subjects and the renown of his glory being spread through the world.

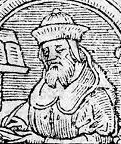
Rashi

Reading Numbers 1:1–2 "The Lord spoke . . . in the Sinai Desert . . . on the first of the month . . . 'Take a census,'" Rashi taught that God counted the Israelites often because they were dear to God. When they left Egypt, God counted them in Exodus 12:37; when many fell because of the sin of the Golden Calf, God counted them in Exodus 32:28 to know the number who survived; when God came to cause the Divine Presence to rest among them, God counted them. On the first of Nisan, the Tabernacle was erected, and on the first of Iyar, God counted them.

The Zohar taught that the "mixed multitude" (עֵרֶב רַב, erev rav) mentioned in Exodus 12:38 consisted entirely of Egyptian sorcerers and magicians, who sought to oppose God's works, as Exodus 7:11 reports, "And the magicians of Egypt, they also did in like manner with their enchantments." When they beheld the signs and the wonders that Moses performed, they came to Moses to be converted. God advised Moses not to accept them, but Moses argued that now that they had seen God's power, they desired to accept the Israelites' Faith, and if they saw God's power every day, they would learn that there is no God like God. So Moses accepted them. Exodus 12:38 called them a "mixed multitude" because they consisted of all the grades of Egyptian magicians, at their head being Jannes and Jambres. During the day, these wizards practiced their enchantments, and after sunset, they made observations of the heavens until the middle of the ninth hour, which was called the "great evening" (עֵרֶב רַב, erev rav, which means both "great multitude" and "great evening"). The lesser magicians then made observation after that until midnight. The Egyptians, who had great faith in the chief wizards, thus called them the "great evening" (עֵרֶב רַב, erev rav).

=== Exodus chapter 13 ===
Noting the universal application of the laws of tefillin in Exodus 13:9, 16, Maimonides taught that God designed the wearing of tefillin as a more enduring form of worship than the practice of sacrifices, which Maimonides taught were a transitional step to wean the Israelites off of the worship of the times and move them toward prayer as the primary means of worship. Maimonides noted that in nature, God created animals that develop gradually. For example, when a mammal is born, it is extremely tender, and cannot eat dry food, so God provided breasts that yield milk to feed the young animal, until it can eat dry food. Similarly, Maimonides taught, God instituted many laws as temporary measures, as it would have been impossible for the Israelites suddenly to discontinue everything to which they had become accustomed. So God sent Moses to make the Israelites (in the words of Exodus 19:6) "a kingdom of priests and a holy nation." But the general custom of worship in those days was sacrificing animals in temples that contained idols. So God did not command the Israelites to give up those manners of service, but allowed them to continue. God changed the service of idol worship to the service of the Sanctuary (Exodus 25:8), to erect the altar to God's name (Exodus 20:21), to offer sacrifices to God (Leviticus 1:2), to bow down to God, and to burn incense before God. God forbad doing any of these things to any other being and selected priests for the service in the temple in Exodus 28:41. By this Divine plan, God blotted out the traces of idolatry, and established the great principle of the Existence and Unity of God. But the sacrificial service, Maimonides taught, was not the primary object of God's commandments about sacrifice; rather, supplications, prayers, and similar kinds of worship are nearer to the primary object. Thus, God limited sacrifice to only one temple (see Deuteronomy 12:26) and the priesthood to only the members of a particular family. These restrictions, Maimonides taught, served to limit sacrificial worship, and kept it within such bounds that God did not feel it necessary to abolish sacrificial service altogether. But in the Divine plan, prayer and supplication can be offered everywhere and by every person, as can be the wearing of tzitzit (Numbers 15:38) and tefillin (Exodus 13:9, 16) and similar kinds of service.

Maimonides explained the laws governing the redemption of a firstborn son (pidyon haben) in Exodus 13:13–16. Maimonides taught that it is a positive commandment for every Jewish man to redeem his son who is the firstborn of a Jewish mother, as Exodus 34:19 says, "All first issues of the womb are mine," and Numbers 18:15 says, "And you shall surely redeem a firstborn man." Maimonides taught that a mother is not obligated to redeem her son. If a father fails to redeem his son, when the son comes of age, he is obligated to redeem himself. If it is necessary for a man to redeem both himself and his son, he should redeem himself first and then his son. If he only has enough money for one redemption, he should redeem himself. A person who redeems his son recites the blessing: "Blessed are You . . . who sanctified us with His commandments and commanded us concerning the redemption of a son." Afterwards, he recites the shehecheyanu blessing and then gives the redemption money to the Cohen. If a man redeems himself, he should recite the blessing: "Blessed . . . who commanded us to redeem the firstborn" and he should recite the shehecheyanu blessing. The father may pay the redemption in silver or in movable property that has financial worth like that of silver coins. If the Cohen desires to return the redemption to the father, he may. The father should not, however, give it to the Cohen with the intent that he return it. The father must give it to the Cohen with the resolution that he is giving him a present without any reservations. Cohens and Levites are exempt from the redemption of their firstborn, as they served as the redemption of the Israelites' firstborn in the desert. One born to a woman of a priestly or Levite family is exempt, for the matter is dependent on the mother, as indicated by Exodus 13:2 and Numbers 3:12. A baby born by Caesarian section and any subsequent birth are exempt: the first because it did not emerge from the womb, and the second, because it was preceded by another birth. The obligation for redemption takes effect when the baby completes 30 days of life, as Numbers 18:16 says, "And those to be redeemed should be redeemed from the age of a month."

== In modern interpretation ==
The parashah is discussed in these modern sources:

=== Exodus chapter 10 ===
Greta Hort argued that the plagues concentrated within a period of about 12 months, based on the report of Exodus 7:7 that Moses was 80 years old when he first spoke with pharaoh and the report of Deuteronomy 34:7 that Moses was 120 years old when he died, after spending 40 years in the wilderness.

John J. Collins reported that some scholars have suggested that the plague stories contain a reminiscence of a mid-fourteenth century BCE epidemic referred to as "the Asiatic illness."

Collins argued that the plague stories show that Exodus is not only the story of the liberation of Israel, but also of the defeat and humiliation of the Egyptians, and thus involved "less than edifying" nationalistic, ethnic vengeance.

Everett Fox noted that "glory" (כְּבוֹד, kevod) and "stubbornness" (כָּבֵד לֵב, kaved lev) are leading words throughout the book of Exodus that give it a sense of unity. Similarly, William Propp identified the root kvd—connoting heaviness, glory, wealth, and firmness—as a recurring theme in Exodus: Moses suffered from a heavy mouth in Exodus 4:10 and heavy arms in Exodus 17:12; Pharaoh had firmness of heart in Exodus 7:14; 8:11, 28; 9:7, 34; and 10:1; Pharaoh made Israel's labor heavy in Exodus 5:9; God in response sent heavy plagues in Exodus 8:20; 9:3, 18, 24; and 10:14, so that God might be glorified over Pharaoh in Exodus 14:4, 17, and 18; and the book culminates with the descent of God's fiery Glory, described as a "heavy cloud," first upon Sinai and later upon the Tabernacle in Exodus 19:16; 24:16–17; 29:43; 33:18, 22; and 40:34–38.

Shakespeare

Harold Fisch argued that the command of Exodus 10:2 and 13:8 to hand on from one generation to another the Exodus story provided the prototype for the ghost's admonition to Prince Hamlet, "Remember me", in Hamlet 1.5/98 of William Shakespeare's play Hamlet.

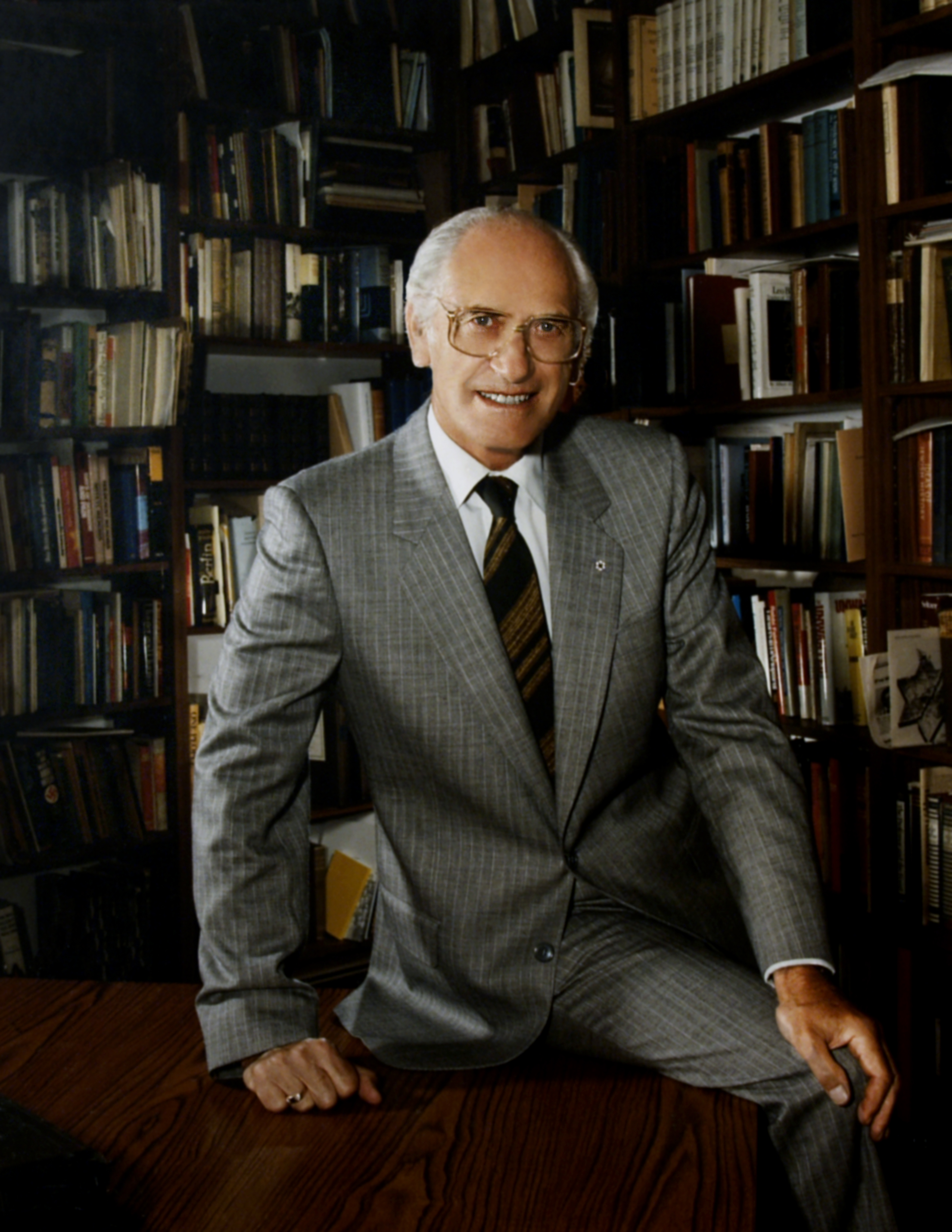
Plaut

Gunther Plaut reported that scholars generally agree that the term "Hebrew" (עִברִי, Ivri), as in Exodus 10:3, came from the name of a group called Habiru or Apiru, people who had lost their status in the community from which they came, and who were not necessarily related except by common fate. Plaut wrote that the Habiru were a class of people who lived in the Fertile Crescent during the 19th to 14th centuries B.C.E. who may originally have come from Arabia, became prominent in Mesopotamia, and later spread to Egypt. The Habiru followed distinct occupations, particularly mercenaries and administrators. Although at first they were nomads or seminomads, they later settled. They were usually considered foreigners, maintaining their group identity. The term Habiru referred not so much to an ethnic or linguistic group as to a social or political group. Plaut reported that the words Habiru and "Hebrew" (עִברִי, Ivri) appear to share a common linguistic root. Plaut concluded that Israelites in Egypt likely occupied positions like, or because of familial ties were identified with, the Habiru. When non-Israelites repeatedly applied the term to the Israelites, the Israelites themselves began to use the name Habiru, which they pronounced Ivri. Plaut considered it possible that for some time the term Ivri was used only when the Israelites spoke of themselves to outsiders and when outsiders referred to them. Thus Genesis 14:13 calls Abram Ivri vis-a-vis an outsider, and Jonah says, "I am an Ivri," when asked his identity by non-Israelite sailors in Jonah 1:9, but otherwise Israelites referred to themselves by their tribes (for example, Judah or Ephraim) or by their common ancestor, Israel.

Shlomo Ephraim Luntschitz (The Kli Yakar) noted that in Exodus 10:6, Moses told Pharaoh that the locusts would invade, "your houses . . . , and the houses of all your servants, and the houses of all the Egyptians," in that order. Arguing that the Pharaoh's palace was surely the most insulated, the Kli Yakar taught that the order of the locust invasion was another miracle, so that the punishment would come in the order that the sin was committed, first with Pharaoh (who was most guilty), then with his servants, and then the rest of the people.

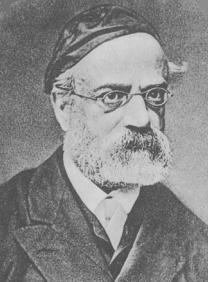
Hirsch

Moritz Markus Kalisch read Exodus 10:7 to indicate that Pharaoh's servants, whom Kalisch identified with Pharaoh's magicians, had become convinced of God's unlimited power.

Samson Raphael Hirsch read Exodus 10:7 to indicate that Pharaoh's servants viewed the cycle of partial plagues and respites as a "trap!"

Nahum Sarna noted that Aaron, not Moses, brought on the early signs and plagues. Sarna explained that Moses thus tacitly asserted his equal status with Pharaoh. Moses came to negotiate with Pharaoh as the representative of the people of Israel. Just as Pharaoh had his magicians, Moses had his assistant, Aaron. Sarna noted that in the narratives of the Ten Plagues, Aaron acted only as long as the Egyptian magicians appeared present. After their ingenuity failed them and they faded from the story, Moses acted personally to bring about the remaining plagues.

=== Exodus chapter 12 ===
Propp identified the protecting paschal blood of Exodus 12:7 as a symbolic wound.

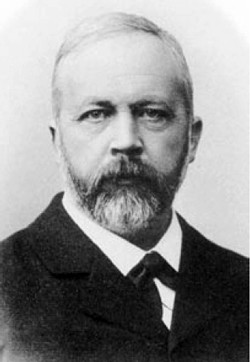
Wellhausen

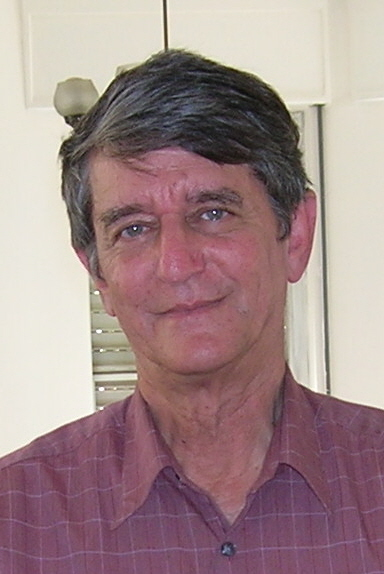
Kugel

Julius Wellhausen conceived of early Israelite religion as linked to nature's annual cycle and believed that Scripture only later connected the festivals to historical events like the Exodus from Egypt. James Kugel reported that modern scholars generally agreed that Passover reflects two originally separate holidays arising out of the annual harvest cycle. One Festival involved the sacrificing and eating of an animal from the flock, the pesa sacrifice, which arose among shepherds who sacrificed in the light of the full moon of the month that marked the vernal equinox and the end of winter (as directed in Exodus 12:6) to bring Divine favor for a safe and prosperous summer for the rest of the flock. The shepherds slaughtered the animal at home, as the rite also stipulated that some of the animal's blood be daubed on the doorposts and lintel of the house (as directed in Exodus 12:7) to ward off evil. The rite prescribed that no bone be broken (as directed in Exodus 12:46) so as not to bring evil on the flock from which the sacrifice came. Scholars suggest that the name pesa derived from the verb that means "hop" (as in 1 Kings 18:21 and 26) and theorize that the holiday may originally have involved some sort of ritual "hopping." A second Festival—the Festival of Unleavened Bread—involved farmers eating unleavened barley bread for seven days when the winter's barley crop had reached maturity and was ready for harvest. Farmers observed this Festival with a trip to a local sanctuary (as in Exodus 23:17 and 34:23). Modern scholars believe that the absence of yeast in the bread indicated purity (as in Leviticus 2:11). The listing of Festivals in Exodus 23:14–17 and 34:18–23 appear to provide evidence for the independent existence of the Festival of Unleavened Bread. Modern scholars suggest that the farmers' Festival of Unleavened Bread and the shepherds' Passover later merged into a single festival, Passover moved from the home to the Temple, and the combined festival was explicitly connected to the Exodus (as in Deuteronomy 16:1–4).

Collins reported that the Egyptians built the city of Pi-Ramesse, mentioned in Exodus 12:37, on the site of the old Hyksos capital of Avari and reoccupied it in the time of Ramesses II (1304–1237 BCE), and as a consequence, most scholars have favored a date around 1250 BCE for the Exodus. Collins argued that all we can really say is that the biblical Exodus account was written some time after the building of Pi-Ramesse and Per-Atum, and possibly that the author knew of a tradition associating Semitic laborers with those cities.

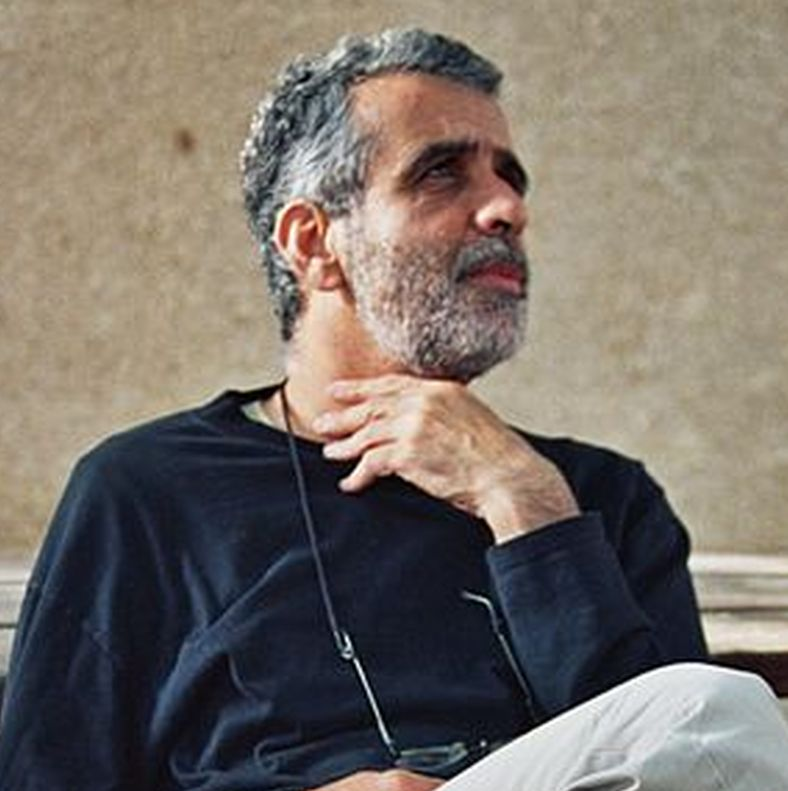
Finkelstein

Israel Finkelstein and Neil Asher Silberman argued that the place Sukkot mentioned in Exodus 12:37 and Numbers 33:5 is probably the Hebrew form of the Egyptian Tjkw, a name referring to a place or an area in the eastern Nile Delta that appears in Egyptian texts from the time of the Nineteenth Dynasty of Egypt, the dynasty of Ramesses II. Finkelstein and Silberman reported that a late thirteenth century BCE Egyptian papyrus recorded that the commanders of the forts along the delta's eastern border closely monitored the movements of foreigners there, saying: "We have completed the entry of the tribes of the Edomite Shasu (that is, Bedouin) through the fortress of Merneptah-Content-with-Truth, which is in Tjkw, to the pools of Pr-Itm which (are) in Tjkw for the sustenance of their flocks." And Finkelstein and Silberman reported that the abundant Egyptian sources describing the time of the New Kingdom of Egypt in general and the thirteenth century in particular make no reference to the Israelites. Finkelstein and Silberman concluded that based on the evidence at the specific sites where Numbers 33 says that the Israelites camped for extended periods during their wandering in the desert (and where some archaeological indication—if present—would almost certainly be found), a mass Exodus did not happen at the time and in the manner described in the Bible.

Plaut noted that while some might read the report of Genesis 15:13 that the time of Israel's servitude would be 400 years to conflict with the report of Exodus 12:40 that the descent into Egypt would last 430 years, the two accounts were left standing side by side, because ancient readers might have considered both traditions to have come down to them and therefore requiring treatment with reverence.

Plaut identified two addenda to the Passover story—one dealing with the eating of the paschal sacrifice in Exodus 12:43–51 and a second relating the Exodus to the first-born in Exodus 13:1–16. Plaut observed that both addenda speak from a context of settled conditions, rather than wilderness wandering. Plaut concluded that the two sections read like postscripts or summations appended to the main story at a later time.

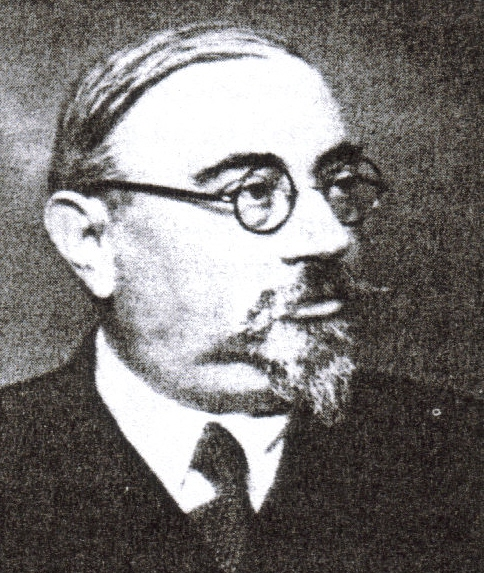
Cassuto

=== Exodus chapter 13 ===
Reading the consecration of the firstborn in Exodus 13:1–2, Umberto Cassuto suggested that the obligation to transfer to God all that first opened the womb meant originally, in the tradition of the ancient East, to offer as a sacrifice, but the Torah when it accepted the custom of the neighboring peoples, introduced innovations and imbued the obligation with new significance. Thus the Torah continued the custom of offering firstborn on the altar only for clean domestic animals; for unclean animals, the Torah substituted redemption by a clean animal or the breaking of its neck; and for human firstborn, the Torah substituted only redemption. And the Torah substituted the new reason of the deliverance from Egyptian bondage.

Sarna wrote that in many ancient cultures, the miracle of new life was considered a divine gift and nature endowed the first fruits of the soil and animal and human fertility with intrinsic holiness. Sarna argued that the instruction to Moses in Exodus 13:1–2 to consecrate the firstborn may have been a polemic against such pagan notions. The Torah dissociated the firstborns' status from the ancient ideas, teaching that firstborns belonged to God solely because of Divine decree at the time of the Exodus. Noting that Numbers 3:12 and 8:16–18 report that the Levites supplanted the firstborn in priestly functions, Sarna inferred that in Exodus 13:1–2, God instructed Moses to install the firstborn to fulfill priestly duties.

Nathan MacDonald reported some dispute over the exact meaning of the description of the Land of Israel as a "land flowing with milk and honey," as in Exodus 3:8 and 17, 13:5, and 33:3, Leviticus 20:24, Numbers 13:27 and 14:8, and Deuteronomy 6:3, 11:9, 26:9 and 15, 27:3, and 31:20. MacDonald wrote that the term for milk (חָלָב, chalav) could easily be the word for "fat" (חֵלֶב, chelev), and the word for honey (דְבָשׁ, devash) could indicate not bees' honey but a sweet syrup made from fruit. The expression evoked a general sense of the bounty of the land and suggested an ecological richness exhibited in a number of ways, not just with milk and honey. MacDonald noted that the expression was always used to describe a land that the people of Israel had not yet experienced, and thus characterized it as always a future expectation.

Ephraim Speiser wrote that the word "Torah" (תּוֹרָה) is based on a verbal stem signifying "to teach, guide," and the like, and the derived noun can carry a variety of meanings. Speiser argued that when the noun is applied to God in Exodus 13:9, its connotation is broadened to embrace a cherished way of life, but cannot be mistaken for the title of the Pentateuch as a whole.

Jacob Milgrom taught that the verbs used in the laws of the redemption of a firstborn son (pidyon haben) in Exodus 13:13–16 and Numbers 3:45–47 and 18:15–16, "natan, kiddesh, he'evir to the Lord," as well as the use of padah, "ransom," indicate that the firstborn son was considered God's property. Milgrom surmised that this may reflect an ancient rule where the firstborn was expected to care for the burial and worship of his deceased parents. Thus, the Bible may preserve the memory of the firstborn bearing a sacred status, and the replacement of the firstborn by the Levites in Numbers 3:11–13, 40–51; and 8:14–18 may reflect the establishment of a professional priestly class. Milgrom dismissed as without support the theory that the firstborn was originally offered as a sacrifice.

In April 2014, the Committee on Jewish Law and Standards of Conservative Judaism ruled that women are now equally responsible for observing commandments as men have been. Under this ruling, Jewish mothers are thus equally responsible for the covenantal naming of their daughters and redemption of their first-born sons and daughters (as called for in Exodus 13:2 and 13–15) as fathers are.

Terence Fretheim argued that Exodus 13:15–16 give a special twist to the issue of the firstborn, teaching that Israel was to be attentive to its firstborn because of the suffering of the Egyptian firstborn. Fretheim noted that Exodus 13:15–16 does not mention the redeemed Israelite children of Passover night but the sacrificed Egyptian firstborn, followed by "Therefore." Fretheim thus argued that the firstborn belong to God not only because Israelite children were saved but also because Egyptian children were killed. Fretheim argued that Exodus 13:15–16 thus reminds Israel at what cost Israel's firstborn were redeemed. Fretheim nonetheless considered it doubtful that child sacrifice was in view.

== Commandments ==
According to Sefer ha-Chinuch, there are 9 positive and 11 negative commandments in the parashah:

- Courts must calculate to determine when a new month begins.

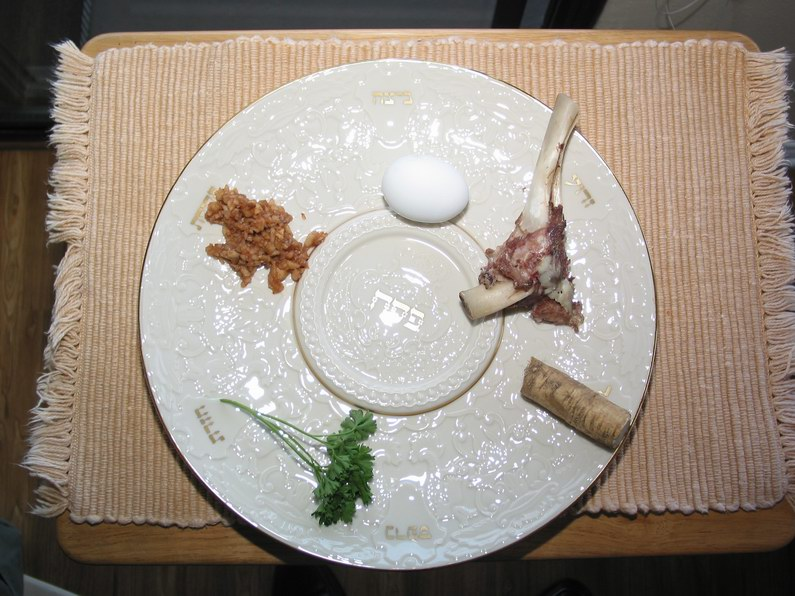
Passover Seder Plate

- To slaughter the Passover lamb at the specified time
- To eat the Passover lamb with unleavened bread (מַצָּה, matzah) and bitter herbs (maror) on the night of the fourteenth of Nisan
- Not to eat the Passover meat raw or boiled
- Not to leave any meat from the Passover lamb over until morning
- To destroy all leavened bread on the 14th of Nisan
- To eat unleavened bread (מַצָּה, matzah) on the first night of Passover
- Not to find chametz in your domain seven days
- Not to eat mixtures containing chametz all seven days of Passover
- An apostate must not eat from the Passover lamb.
- A permanent or temporary hired worker must not eat from it.
- Not to take the paschal meat from the confines of the group
- Not to break any bones of the Passover lamb
- An uncircumcised male must not eat from it.
- To set aside the firstborn animals
- Not to eat chametz all seven days of Passover
- Not to see chametz in your domain seven days
- To relate the Exodus from Egypt on the first night of Passover
- To redeem the firstborn donkey by giving a lamb to a Kohen
- To break the neck of the donkey if the owner does not intend to redeem it

== In the liturgy ==
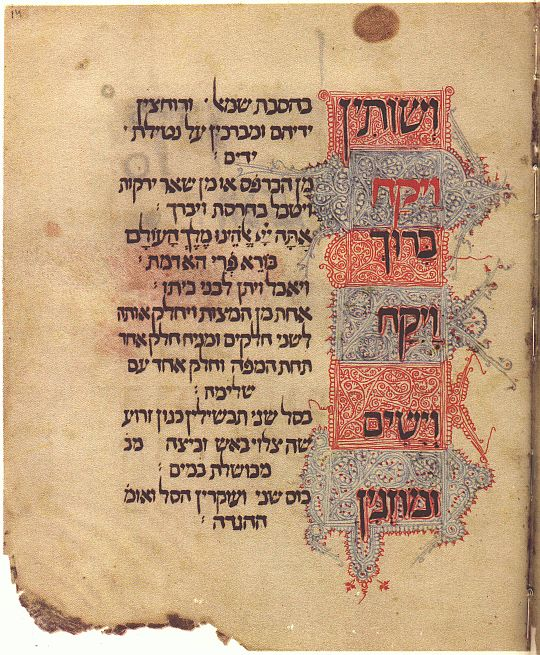
A page from the 14th century Kaufmann Haggadah

Reading the Passover Haggadah, in the magid section of the Seder, many Jews remove drops of wine from their cups for each of the ten plagues in Exodus 7:14–12:29 to show their joy is lessened due to the suffering of the Egyptians.

Also in the magid section, the Haggadah quotes Exodus 12:12 to elucidate the report in Deuteronomy 26:8 that "the Lord brought us forth out of Egypt with a mighty hand." The Haggadah cites Exodus 12:12 for the proposition that God took the Israelites out of Egypt not through an angel, not through a seraph, not through an agent, but on God's own.

Also in the magid section, the Haggadah quotes Exodus 12:26 to provide the question of the wicked son and quotes Exodus 13:8 to answer him. And shortly thereafter, the Haggadah quotes Exodus 13:14 to answer the simple child and quotes Exodus 13:8 again to answer the child who does not know how to ask.

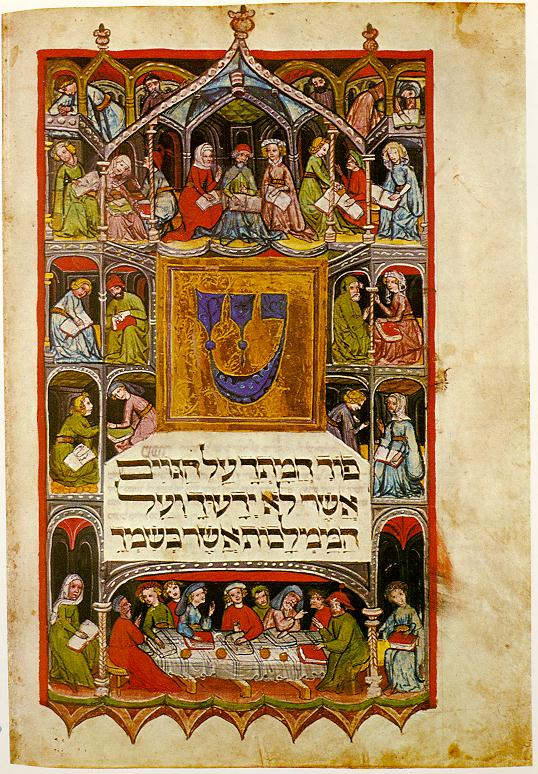
A page from a 14th-century German Haggadah

Also in the magid section, the Haggadah quotes Exodus 12:27 to answer the question: For what purpose did the Israelites eat the Passover offering at the time of the Temple in Jerusalem? The Haggadah quotes Exodus 12:27 for the proposition that the Israelites did so because God passed over the Israelites' houses in Egypt.

In the concluding nirtzah section, the Haggadah quotes the words "it is the Passover sacrifice" from Exodus 12:27 eight times as the refrain of a poem by Eleazar Kallir. Also in the nirtzah section, the Haggadah quotes the words "it was the middle of the night" from Exodus 12:29 eight times as the refrain of a poem by Yannai.

Rabbinic tradition interpreted Psalm 113 as the Psalm that the Israelites recited in Egypt on the night that God smote all the firstborn in the land of Egypt in Exodus 12:29, and thus Jews recite Psalm 113 as the first Psalm of Hallel on Festivals and during the Passover Seder.

Also in the nirtzah section, in a reference to the Israelites' despoiling of the Egyptians in Exodus 12:36, the Haggadah recounts how the Egyptians could not find their wealth when they arose at night.

In the magid section, the Haggadah quotes Exodus 12:39–40 to answer the question: For what purpose do Jews eat unleavened bread (מַצָּה, matzah)? The Haggadah quotes Exodus 12:39–40 for the proposition that Jews do so because there was not sufficient time for the Israelites' dough to become leavened before God redeemed them.

In the magid section, the Haggadah responds to a question that "one could think" that Exodus 13:5–6 raises—that the obligation to tell the Exodus story begins on the first of the month—and clarifies that the obligation begins when Jews have their maztah and maror in front of them.

Also in the magid section, the Haggadah quotes Exodus 13:8—emphasizing the word "for me" (li)—for the proposition that in every generation, Jews have a duty to regard themselves as though they personally had gone out of Egypt.

Many Jews recite Exodus 13:1–10 and 13:11–16, two of the four texts contained in the tefillin, either immediately after putting on the tefillin or before removing them, as Jews interpret Exodus 13:9 to make reference to tefillin when it says, "and it shall be for a sign to you upon your hand, and for a memorial between your eyes," and Exodus 13:16 to make reference to tefillin when it says, "and it shall be for a sign upon your hand, and for frontlets between your eyes."

Much of the language of the leshem yihud prayer before putting on tefillin is drawn from Ramban's commentary on Exodus 13:11.

== Haftarah ==
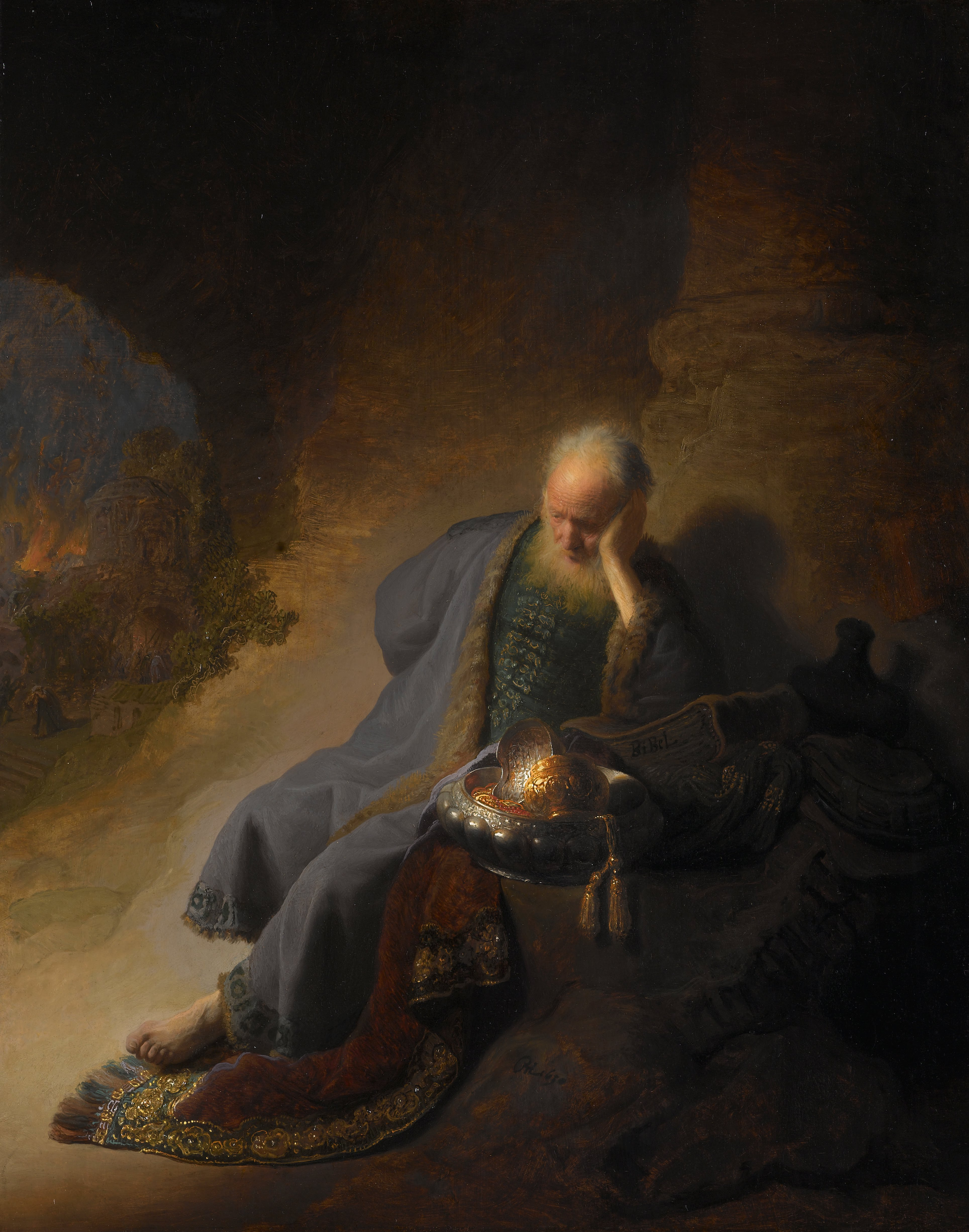
Jeremiah Lamenting the Destruction of Jerusalem (1630 painting by Rembrandt)

The haftarah for the parashah is Jeremiah 46:13–28.

=== Connection to the Parashah ===
Both the parashah and the haftarah describe God's judgment against Egypt. The parashah reports that God told Moses to go (bo) to Pharaoh; the haftarah reports God's word that Nebuchadrezzar would come (la-vo) to Pharaoh. Both the parashah and the haftarah report a plague of locusts—literal in the parashah, figurative in the haftarah. Both the parashah and the haftarah report God's punishment of Egypt's gods. And both the parashah and the haftarah report God's ultimate deliverance of the Israelites from their captivity.
