= Wahconah Park =

Baseball park in Pittsfield, Massachusetts, US

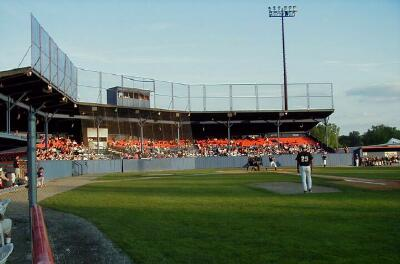
- Interactive map of Wahconah Park
- Address: 105 Wahconah St. Pittsfield, Massachusetts
- Coordinates: 42.462319°N 73.252582°W
- Owner: City of Pittsfield
- Capacity: 3,500

Construction
- Built: 1919

Tenants
- Pittsfield Electrics (Eastern Association) 1913–14; Pittsfield Hillies (Eastern League) 1919–30; Pittsfield Electrics (Canadian–American League) 1941–48; Pittsfield Indians (Canadian–American League) 1949–50; Pittsfield Phillies (Canadian–American League) 1951; Pittsfield Red Sox (Eastern League) 1965–69; Pittsfield Senators (Eastern League) 1970–71; Pittsfield Rangers (Eastern League) 1972–75; Berkshire Brewers (Eastern League) 1976; Pittsfield Cubs (Eastern League) 1985–88; Pittsfield Mets (NYPL) 1989–2000; Pittsfield Astros (NYPL) 2001; Berkshire Black Bears (Northeast League) 2002–2003; Pittsfield Dukes (NECBL) 2005–2008; Pittsfield American Defenders (NECBL) 2008–2009; Pittsfield Colonials (Can-Am League) 2010–2011; Pittsfield Suns (FCBL) 2012–2023
- Wahconah Park
- U.S. National Register of Historic Places
- Location within Massachusetts Location within the United States
- Area: 18.2 acres (7.4 ha)
- Built: 1892
- Architect: Joseph McArthur Vance, David McNab Deans
- Architectural style: shed-roof grandstand w/ wing
- NRHP reference No.: 05000878
- Added to NRHP: August 12, 2005

Wahconah Park is a city-owned baseball park located in Pittsfield, Massachusetts, and nestled in a working-class neighborhood. One of the last remaining ballparks in the United States with a wooden grandstand, it was constructed in 1919 and seats 4,500. Through the park's history, 201 different Pittsfield players went on to the Major Leagues, and 100 different Pittsfield players already had some Major League experience. The park was listed on the National Register of Historic Places in 2005.

In the July 23, 1990, issue of Sports Illustrated, author Daniel Okrent raved about the park in his column entitled Just A Little Bit of Heaven – Pittsfield's Wahconah Park is Baseball as it Oughta Be.

In 2012, the stadium became the home field of the Pittsfield Suns, an expansion franchise of the Futures Collegiate Baseball League, although the Suns have not played since the 2024 season.

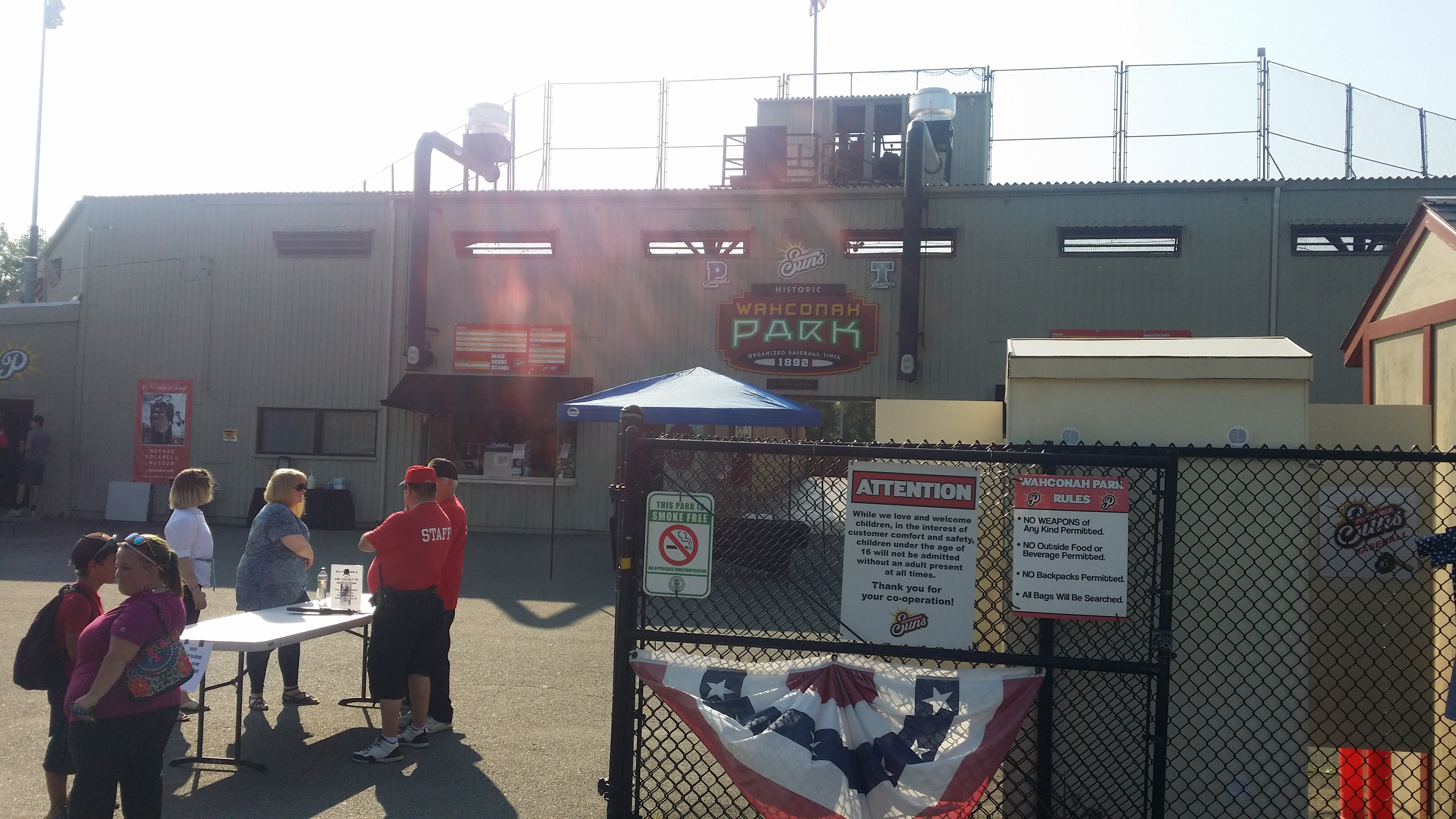
The exterior of Wahconah Park in 2019

== Field configuration ==
Former park dimensions were 334 feet to left field, 374 feet to center field, and 333 feet to right field. The current field dimensions are 310 feet down the left field line, 377 feet to left field, 374 feet to center field, 403 feet to right-center field, and 305 feet down the right field line.

Because the field was constructed before the advent of field lighting, no harm was seen in orienting the diamond due west. It is one of only two professional ballparks in the U.S. today that faces west (the other being Sam Lynn Ballpark in Bakersfield, California, built in 1941). Lights were not installed until 1946. In 1989 a mesh screen was placed in center field. Nevertheless, some umpires still briefly suspend games at sunset, so that the setting sun will not interfere with the batters' view of the pitch.

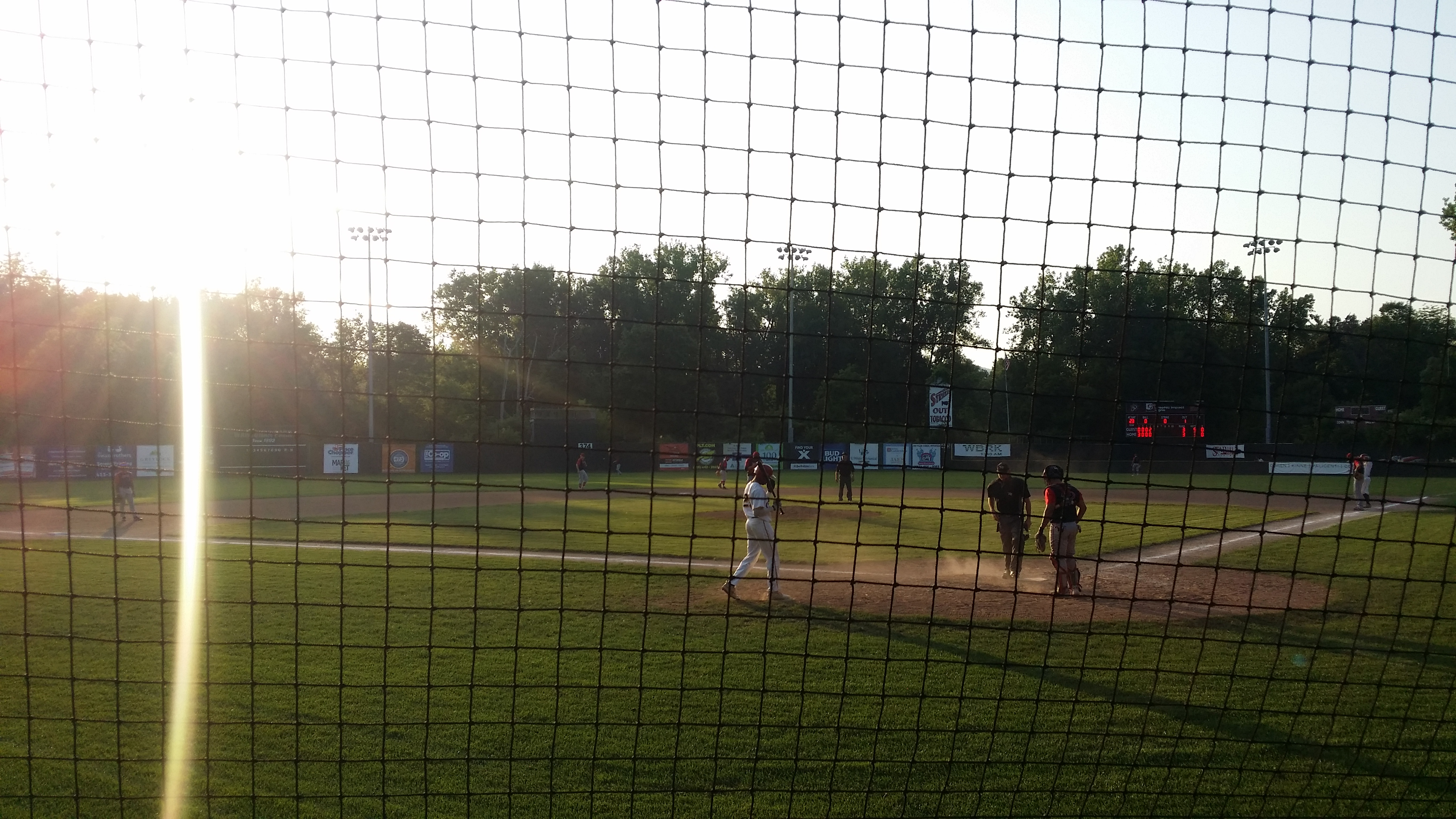
The sun shining onto the field at Wahconah Park

In 1927, a dike was installed on the Housatonic River to prevent recurrent flooding.

== History ==
The Pittsfield Mets were a minor-league baseball team moved to Pittsfield, Massachusetts from Little Falls, New York, by an investment group organized by Michael T. Casey. The team played in the New York - Penn League, and were affiliated with the New York Mets from 1989 to 2000 and the Houston Astros in 2001.

In 2002, the independent Berkshire Black Bears moved to Wahconah Park after three years of dormancy as the Massachusetts Mad Dogs. After the 2003 season, they did not renew their lease but moved to New Haven, Connecticut.

Jim Bouton proposed to renovate the park without any public dollars and bring professional baseball back. On July 3, 2004, a record crowd of 5,000 attended a vintage baseball game he organized at Wahconah Park between Pittsfield and Hartford, a game telecast live for over four hours on ESPN Classic as America's Pastime: Vintage Baseball, Live. Commentators included Bouton, Bill Lee, actor Tim Robbins, and baseball historians John Thorn and David Pietrusza. Eventually, Pittsfield politics intervened and Bouton was forced out.

In 2005, former Boston Red Sox General Manager Dan Duquette brought the Pittsfield Dukes, a New England Collegiate Baseball League (NECBL) team, to Wahconah Park. During the 2007 season, the Dukes attracted a season attendance of 28,955 through 21 home games, averaging 1,378 fans per game. His agreement with the City of Pittsfield was jeopardized prior to the 2008 season over back maintenance fees, but Duquette and city officials reached a settlement. For the 2009 season, Duquette restyled the team the Pittsfield American Defenders, with a military theme. The park was called Nokona Stadium at Wahconah Park pursuant to a sponsorship deal with the manufacturer of baseball gloves that funded all-new bathrooms, stadium offices, and press box. On May 3, 2009, Williams College and Amherst College alumni played a game under 1859 rules to commemorate the 150th-anniversary of the first college baseball game, played between the two schools. Duquette, an alumnus of Amherst, was instrumental in organizing the event.

The Pittsfield American Defenders lasted only one season. In 2010, Duquette moved the NECBL franchise to his baseball camp in nearby Hinsdale, and moved his Can-Am League entry, the New Hampshire American Defenders, to Wahconah Park from Nashua, New Hampshire; they were known as the Pittsfield Colonials.

== Current tenant ==
In 2012, the Pittsfield Suns, an expansion franchise of the Futures Collegiate Baseball League (FCBL), began playing at Wahconah Park. Marvin Goldklang is the majority owner; the Goldklang Group also owns part of the club. Goldklang previously owned and operated the Pittsfield Mets.

In March 2024, the FCBL announced that the Suns would not play the 2024 season because of safety issues at Wahconah Park. Pittsfield was also scheduled to sit out the 2025 season. The Suns aren't playing in 2026 due to renovations to Wahconah Park.

In the summer, concerts are held in Wahconah Park. It is also home to varsity football games for Pittsfield-area high schools.

In July 2025, the Pittsfield Parks Commission voted to have the grandstand demolished. The grandstand installed in 1950, is not structurally sound to reuse, and will be demolished in the fall of 2025. The field will remain available as well as temporary accommodations while the grandstand is rebuilt.

== Professional teams at Wahconah Park ==
League	Team(s)	Year(s)
Eastern Association (Class B)	Pittsfield Electrics	1913–1914
Eastern League (Class A)	Pittsfield Hillies	1919–1930
Canadian–American League (Class C)	Pittsfield Electrics	1941–1948
Canadian–American League (Class C)	Pittsfield Indians	1949–1950
Canadian–American League (Class C)	Pittsfield Phillies	1951
Eastern League (Class AA)	Pittsfield Red Sox	1965–69
Eastern League (Class AA)	Pittsfield Senators	1970–1971
Eastern League (Class AA)	Pittsfield Rangers	1972–1975
Eastern League (Class AA)	Berkshire Brewers	1976
Eastern League (Class AA)	Pittsfield Cubs	1985–1988
New York–Penn League (Class A)	Pittsfield Mets	1989–2000
New York–Penn League (Class A)	Pittsfield Astros	2001
Northeast League (Independent)	Berkshire Black Bears	2002–2003
New England Collegiate Baseball League (Collegiate)	Pittsfield Dukes	2005–2008
New England Collegiate Baseball League (Collegiate)	Pittsfield American Defenders	2009
Canadian–American League (Independent)	Pittsfield Colonials	2010–2011
Futures Collegiate Baseball League (Collegiate)	Pittsfield Suns	2012–present

== Future major-league Pittsfield players ==
- Lew Wendell, Electrics (1913)
- Pat Parker, Electrics (1914)
- Otto Rettig, Electrics (1914)
- Cliff Brady, Hillies (1919–20)
- Paddy Smith, Hillies (1920)
- Charlie Hargreaves, Hillies (1921–1922)
- Bob Barrett, Hillies (1923)
- Joe Batchelder, Hillies (1923, 1926)
- Si Rosenthal, Hillies (1923)
- Ed Taylor, Hillies (1923)
- Clay Van Alstyne, Hillies (1923–1924)
- Earl Webb, Hillies (1923–1924)
- Chick Autry, Hillies (1924)
- Hal Goldsmith, Hillies (1924)
- Mule Haas, Hillies (1924)
- Ike Kamp, Hillies (1924)
- Hunter Lane, Hillies (1924)
- Art Mills, Hillies (1924–1926)
- Joe Benes, Hillies (1925)
- Bill Cronin, Hillies (1926)
- Paul Richards, Hillies (1926)
- Charlie Bates, Hillies (1927)
- Joe Cascarella, Hillies (1927–1928)
- Augie Walsh, Hillies (1927)
- Jack Burns, Hillies (1928)
- Ed Connolly, Hillies (1928–1929)
- George Loepp, Hillies (1928)
- Joe Cicero, Hillies (1929)
- Ed Durham, Hillies (1929)
- Frank Mulroney, Hillies (1929)
- Owen Kahn, Hillies (1930)
- Jorge Comellas, Electrics (1941)
- Walt Linden, Electrics (1941)
- John O'Neil, Electrics (1942)
- Al Rosen, Electrics (1946)
- Hal Naragon, Electrics (1947)
- Jim Lemon, Electrics (1948)
- Don Minnick, Indians (1949)
- Brooks Lawrence, Indians (1950)
- Stan Pawloski, Indians (1950)
- Dick Tomanek, Indians (1950)
- Chris Coletta, Red Sox (1965–1969)
- Pete Magrini, Red Sox (1965)
- Al Montreuil, Red Sox (1965–1968)
- Jerry Moses, Red Sox (1965–1967)
- George Scott, Red Sox (1965)
- Reggie Smith, Red Sox (1965)
- Gary Waslewski, Red Sox (1965)
- Fred Wenz, Red Sox (1965)
- Billy Conigliaro, Red Sox (1966, 1968)
- Carmen Fanzone, Red Sox (1966–1968)
- Jerry Janeski, Red Sox (1966, 1968)
- Sparky Lyle, Red Sox (1966)
- Bobby Mitchell, Red Sox (1966–1967)
- Bob Montgomery, Red Sox (1966)
- Ken Wright, Red Sox (1966–1968)
- Ken Brett, Red Sox (1967)
- Russ Gibson, Red Sox (1967)
- Ron Klimkowski, Red Sox (1967)
- Ed Phillips, Red Sox (1967)
- Ken Poulsen, Red Sox (1967)
- Luis Alvarado, Red Sox (1968)
- Dick Baney, Red Sox (1968)
- Mark Schaeffer, Red Sox (1968)
- Carlton Fisk, Red Sox (1969)
- Buddy Hunter, Red Sox (1969)
- Bill Lee, Red Sox (1969)
- Rick Miller, Red Sox (1969)
- Dick Mills, Red Sox (1969)
- Larry Biittner, Senators (1970)
- Don Castle, Senators (1970)
- Dave Moates, Senators (1970–1972)
- Rick Stelmaszek, Senators (1970)
- John Wockenfuss, Senators & Rangers (1970–1972)
- Steve Foucault, Senators (1970)
- Bill Gogolewski, Senators (1970)
- Rick Henninger, Senators & Rangers (1970–1971)
- Jeff Terpko, Senators & Rangers (1970–1971, 1974)
- Mike Thompson, Senators (1970)
- Bill Fahey, Rangers (1971)
- Jim Kremmel, Rangers (1971–1972)
- Joe Lovitto, Rangers (1971)
- Bill Madlock, Rangers (1971–1972)
- Rick Waits, Rangers (1971–1972)
- Jim Kremmel, Rangers (1971–1972)
- Lew Beasley, Rangers (1972–1975)
- Roy Howell, Rangers (1972–1973)
- Pete Mackanin, Rangers (1972)
- Greg Pryor, Rangers (1972, 1974)
- Tom Robson, Rangers (1972–1973)
- Dave Criscione, Rangers (1973)
- Mike Cubbage, Rangers (1973)
- Ken Pape, Rangers (1973–1974)
- Jim Sundberg, Rangers (1973)
- Stan Thomas, Rangers(1973)
- Doug Ault, Rangers (1974–1975)
- Brian Doyle, Rangers (1974)
- Ron Pruitt, Rangers (1974)
- Jim Umbarger, Rangers (1974)
- Len Barker, Rangers (1975)
- Tommy Boggs, Rangers (1975)
- Dan Duran, Rangers (1975)
- Greg Mahlberg, Rangers (1975)
- John Poloni, Rangers (1975)
- Keith Smith, Rangers (1975)
- John Sutton, Rangers (1975)
- Bump Wills, Rangers (1975)
- Dick Davis, Brewers (1976)
- Greg Erardi, Brewers (1976)
- Gary Holle, Brewers (1976)
- Dan Thomas, Brewers (1976)
- Gary Beare, Brewers (1976)
- Barry Cort, Brewers (1976)
- Sam Hinds, Brewers (1976)
- Johnny Abrego, Cubs (1985)
- Mike Brumley, Cubs (1985)
- Mike Capel, Cubs (1985–1986)
- Steve Engel, Cubs (1985)
- Darrin Jackson, Cubs (1985–1986)
- Jamie Moyer, Cubs (1985)
- Gary Varsho, Cubs (1985–1986)
- Rich Amaral, Cubs (1986–1988)
- Damon Berryhill, Cubs (1986)
- Drew Hall, Cubs (1986)
- Les Lancaster, Cubs (1986)
- Greg Maddux, Cubs (1986)
- Mike Martin, Cubs (1986)
- Paul Noce, Cubs (1986)
- Rafael Palmeiro, Cubs (1986)
- Rolando Roomes, Cubs (1986–1987)
- Phil Stephenson, Cubs (1986)
- Doug Dascenzo, Cubs (1987)
- Mark Grace, Cubs (1987)
- Dave Pavlas, Cubs (1987)
- Jeff Pico, Cubs (1987)
- Laddie Renfroe, Cubs (1987–1988)
- Rich Scheid, Cubs (1987–1988)
- Dwight Smith, Cubs (1987)
- Héctor Villanueva, Cubs (1987–1988)
- Rick Wrona, Cubs (1987–1988)
- Jim Bullinger, Cubs (1988)
- Joe Girardi, Cubs (1988)
- Mike Harkey, Cubs (1988)
- Joe Kraemer, Cubs (1988)
- Ced Landrum, Cubs (1988)
- Kelly Mann, Cubs (1988)
- Jeff Schwarz, Cubs (1988)
- Jerome Walton, Cubs (1988)
- Dean Wilkins, Cubs (1988)
- Alberto Castillo, Mets (1989–1990)
- Denny Harriger, Mets (1989)
- Pat Howell, Mets (1989)
- John Johnstone, Mets (1989)
- Tito Navarro, Mets (1989)
- Curtis Pride, Mets (1989)
- Dave Telgheder, Mets (1989)
- Joe Vitko, Mets (1989)
- Alan Zinter, Mets (1989)
- Jeromy Burnitz, Mets (1990)
- Mike Thomas, Mets (1990)
- Pete Walker, Mets (1990)
- Juan Castillo, Mets (1990)
- Micah Franklin, Mets (1991)
- Guillermo García, Mets (1991–1992)
- Ricky Otero, Mets (1991)
- Quilvio Veras, Mets (1991)
- Héctor Carrasco, Mets (1991)
- Edgardo Alfonzo, Mets (1992)
- Brian Daubach, Mets (1992)
- Bill Pulsipher, Mets (1992)
- Benny Agbayani, Mets (1993)
- Preston Wilson, Mets (1993)
- Jason Isringhausen, Mets (1993)
- Eric Ludwick, Mets (1993)
- Allen McDill, Mets (1993)
- Jeff Tam, Mets (1993)
- Mike Welch, Mets (1993)
- Jarrod Patterson, Mets (1994)
- Jay Payton, Mets (1994)
- Scott Sauerbeck, Mets (1994)
- Vance Wilson, Mets (1994)
- Terrence Long, Mets (1995)
- Dan Murray, Mets (1995)
- Ramón Tatís, Mets (1995)
- Brandon Villafuerte, Mets (1996)
- A. J. Burnett, Mets (1997)
- Eric Cammack, Mets (1997)
- Leo Estrella, Mets (1997)
- Jason Phillips, Mets (1997)
- Jason Roach, Mets (1997, 2000)
- Earl Snyder, Mets (1998)
- Ty Wigginton, Mets (1998)
- Chris Başak, Mets (2000)
- Jaime Cerda, Mets (2000)
- Jeff Duncan, Mets (2000)
- Philip Barzilla, Astros (2001)
- Brooks Conrad, Astros (2001)
- Charlton Jimerson, Astros (2001)
- Todd Self, Astros (2001)
- Declan Cronin, White Sox (2023)

== Pittsfield players with previous major-league experience ==
- Art Nichols, Electrics (1913)
- Jock Somerlott, Electrics (1913–1914)
- Polly Wolfe, Electrics (1913–1914)
- Bun Troy, Electrics (1914)
- Frank Nicholson, Electrics (1914)
- Joe Birmingham, Hillies (1919–1920)
- Mickey Devine, Hillies (1919)
- Gary Fortune, Hillies (1919)
- Jack Hammond, Hillies (1919–1921)
- Bobby Messenger, Hillies (1919–1920)
- Ty Pickup, Hillies (1919–1920)
- Johnny Tillman, Hillies (1919–1923)
- Lew Wendell, Hillies (1919)
- Frank Kelliher, Hillies (1920)
- Colonel Snover, Hillies (1920–1925)
- Bill McCorry, Hillies (1921–1923)
- Al Pierotti, Hillies (1921–1922)
- Ernie Neitzke, Hillies (1922)
- Danny Silva, Hillies (1922)
- Eddie Zimmerman, Hillies (1922)
- Neal Ball, Hillies (1923)
- Chick Gagnon, Hillies (1923)
- Hal Leathers, Hillies (1923)
- Bunny Roser, Hillies (1923)
- Art Wilson, Hillies (1923)
- Mike Wilson, Hillies (1923)
- Jimmy Esmond, Hillies (1924)
- Waddy Macphee, Hillies (1924–1925)
- Horace Milan, Hillies (1924, 1926)
- Mose Solomon, Hillies (1924)
- Red Torphy, Hillies (1924–1925)
- Shano Collins, Hillies (1925, 1928)
- Lefty Jamerson, Hillies (1925–1926)
- Tom Sullivan, Hillies (1925)
- Augie Swentor, Hillies (1925)
- Rowdy Elliott, Hillies (1926)
- Ken Jones, Hillies (1926)
- Sam Mayer, Hillies (1926, 1929)
- John Perrin, Hillies (1926)
- Red Sheridan, Hillies (1926–1928)
- Ed Sperber, Hillies (1926)
- Dan Woodman, Hillies (1926)
- Ed Baecht, Hillies (1927)
- Harry Baldwin, Hillies (1927–1928)
- Ed Miller, Hillies (1927)
- Frank Parkinson, Hillies (1927–1928)
- John Shea, Hillies (1928–1929)
- Joe Smith, Hillies (1927)
- Red Smith, Hillies (1927)
- Denny Sothern, Hillies (1927)
- Lefty Taber, Hillies (1927)
- Mule Watson, Hillies (1927)
- Frank Bennett, Hillies (1928)
- Herb Bradley, Hillies (1928–1929)
- Ralph Head, Hillies (1928)
- Red Shea, Hillies (1928)
- Charlie Small, Hillies (1928–1930)
- Harry Wilke, Hillies (1928–1930)
- Bob Asbjornson, Hillies (1929)
- Frank Bushey, Hillies (1928–1929)
- Freddie Moncewicz, Hillies (1929)
- José Rodríguez (infielder), Hillies (1929–1930)
- Pat Simmons, Hillies (1929–1930)
- Carl Sumner, Hillies (1929)
- Hod Lisenbee, Hillies (1929)
- Maurice Archdeacon, Hillies (1930)
- Jim Bishop, Hillies (1930)
- Ray Dobens, Hillies (1930)
- Bob Emmerich, Hillies (1930)
- Bill Holland, Electrics (1941)
- Glenn Spencer, Electrics (1941)
- Tony Rensa, Electrics (1946–1947)
- Gene Hasson, Electrics & Indians (1948–1949)
- Lloyd Brown, Indians (1950)
- Dave Gray, Red Sox (1965)
- Billy MacLeod, Red Sox (1965)
- Pete Smith, Red Sox (1965)
- Ed Connolly, Red Sox (1966)
- Bobby Guindon, Red Sox (1966–1968)
- Pete Charton, Red Sox (1967)
- Galen Cisco, Red Sox (1967)
- Billy Gardner, Red Sox (1967, 1969)
- Bill Schlesinger, Red Sox (1967–1968)
- Jose Tartabull, Red Sox (1967)
- Dave Gray, Red Sox (1968–1969)
- Russ Nixon, Red Sox (1968)
- Fred Wenz, Red Sox (1969)
- Tom Parsons, Red Sox (1969)
- Toby Harrah, Senators (1970)
- Gene Martin, Senators (1970)
- Charley Walters, Senators & Rangers (1971–1972)
- Dick Such, Rangers (1973)
- Tommy Cruz, Rangers (1974)
- Marty Martínez, Rangers (1975)
- Lafayette Currence, Brewers (1976)
- Lary Sorensen, Brewers (1976)
- Jeff Cornell, Cubs (1985)
- Steve Hammond, Cubs (1985)
- Jeff Jones, Cubs (1985)
- Dickie Noles, Cubs (1987)
- Al Chambers, Cubs (1988)

== See also ==
- National Register of Historic Places listings in Berkshire County, Massachusetts
