= Pittsfield Red Sox =

- 1965–1969; Pittsfield, Massachusetts

Minor league affiliations
- Previous classes: Double-A (1965–1969)
- League: Eastern League (1965–1969)

Major league affiliations
- Previous teams: Boston Red Sox (1965–1969)

Minor league titles
- League titles: 1965

Team data
- Previous parks: Wahconah Park

The Pittsfield Red Sox was the name of an American minor league baseball franchise based in Pittsfield, Massachusetts, from 1965 through 1969. It was the Double-A Eastern League affiliate in the Boston Red Sox farm system and produced future Major League Baseball players such as George Scott, Sparky Lyle, Reggie Smith and Hall of Famer Carlton Fisk. The team played at Wahconah Park.

== Professional baseball in Pittsfield before 1965 ==
The Berkshire city fielded its first team in Organized Baseball in 1894 when the Pittsfield Colts debuted in the New York State League, but the Colts folded after 30 games. After the Pittsfield Electrics played two seasons (1913–1914) in the Class B Eastern Association, which folded after the 1914 campaign, Pittsfield was first represented in the Eastern League (then Class A) in 1919–1920 as the Hillies, and won the 1919 EL pennant.

Pittsfield then fielded a team in the Class C Canadian–American League from 1941 through 1951 (although the league suspended operations for 1943–1945 due to World War II). This club, initially nicknamed the Electrics, was affiliated with the Detroit Tigers (1942), Cleveland Indians (1946–1950) and Philadelphia Phillies (1951). After 1948, it dropped the Electrics identity and was named after its parent club.

== The Pittsfield Red Sox ==
The Can-Am League folded after the 1951 campaign, and Pittsfield was without representation in organized ball for the next 13 years. But after the 1964 season, Joe Buzas, owner of the Reading Red Sox, Boston's Double-A farm team, announced plans to move his franchise to Pittsfield. The 1965 Pittsfield club, managed by Eddie Popowski, proved to be a powerhouse. Led by Scott, who won the league's Triple Crown, and left-handed pitcher Billy MacLeod, a Gloucester, Massachusetts, native who had a perfect 18–0 season, the Red Sox won 85 of 140 games and nipped the Elmira Pioneers (a Baltimore Orioles farm team managed by Earl Weaver) by a game for the EL pennant and league championship. Pittsfield also led the league in home attendance that season.

Three years later, Pittsfield enjoyed another banner season when the 1968 Red Sox, managed by Billy Gardner, won 84 of 139 games and the regular-season title before falling to the Reading Phillies in the finals of the playoffs. That club was paced by future MLB infielders Luis Alvarado and Carmen Fanzone and included future MLB outfielder Billy Conigliaro. Attendance rose to a peak of 79,000 fans in 1969, but Buzas and the Red Sox decided to locate their Eastern League franchise closer to Boston, and moved the club to Pawtucket, Rhode Island, and McCoy Stadium in 1970.

Year	Record	Finish Full Season	Attendance	Manager	Postseason
1965	85–55	First	79,001	Eddie Popowski	League champions
1966	68–71	Second (tied)	51,113	Eddie Popowski	No playoffs held
1967	75–62	Second (East Division)	40,420	Billy Gardner	DNQ
1968	84–55	First	48,067	Billy Gardner	Lost to Reading in finals
1969	68–72	Fourth	79,642	Billy Gardner	Playoffs cancelled

== Later Eastern League franchises ==
The Washington Senators moved quickly and replaced the Red Sox in 1970, and the Pittsfield Senators (later Rangers when the parent team moved to Dallas-Fort Worth) remained through 1975. The Milwaukee Brewers replaced the Rangers in 1976, and the team played a season as the Berkshire Brewers. With fan support at a new low — only 23,500 fans came through the turnstiles all season — the franchise moved to Holyoke, Massachusetts, as the Holyoke Millers, and Pittsfield was again left without baseball, this time for eight seasons.

But in 1985, the Buffalo Bisons moved up from the EL to the Triple-A American Association, creating a need for an eighth Eastern League franchise, and the Chicago Cubs placed their Double-A affiliate in Wahconah Park. The Pittsfield Cubs played through 1988, fielding such players as Rafael Palmeiro and Mark Grace, and winning the 1987 regular season title. But the Cubs' attendance was mired at the bottom of the league. After 1988, the Eastern League reorganized, replacing Pittsfield and other under-performing markets with new cities.

However, Pittsfield continued to participate in professional baseball at a lower classification, in the Short Season Class A New York–Penn League (1989–2001) and in various independent baseball leagues since 2002. The Pittsfield Mets of the New York–Penn League would shatter the attendance marks of the higher-classification Eastern League teams, despite playing in a short-season league with fewer than 40 home games each season.

== Future Major League Pittsfield Red Sox ==
- Chris Coletta (1965–1969)
- Pete Magrini (1965)
- Al Montreuil (1965–1968)
- Jerry Moses (1965–1967)
- George Scott (1965)
- Reggie Smith (1965)
- Gary Waslewski (1965)
- Fred Wenz (1965)
- Billy Conigliaro (1966, 1968)
- Carmen Fanzone (1966–1968)
- Jerry Janeski (1966, 1968)
- Sparky Lyle (1966)
- Bobby Mitchell (1966–1967)
- Bob Montgomery (1966)
- Ken Wright (1966–1968)
- Ken Brett (1967)
- Russ Gibson (1967)
- Ron Klimkowski (1967)
- Ed Phillips (1967)
- Ken Poulsen (1967)
- Luis Alvarado (1968)
- Dick Baney (1968)
- Mark Schaeffer (1968)
- Carlton Fisk (1969)
- Buddy Hunter (1969)
- Bill Lee (1969)
- Rick Miller (1969)
- Dick Mills (1969)

== Pittsfield Red Sox with previous Major League Experience ==
- Dave Gray (1965)
- Billy MacLeod (1965)
- Pete Smith (1965)
- Ed Connolly (1966)
- Bobby Guindon (1966–1968)
- Pete Charton (1967)
- Galen Cisco (1967)
- Billy Gardner (1967, 1969)
- Bill Schlesinger (1967–1968)
- Jose Tartabull (1967)
- Dave Gray (1968–1969)
- Russ Nixon (1968)
- Fred Wenz (1969)
- Tom Parsons (1969)

== See also ==
- Berkshire Brewers
- Pittsfield Mets
- Pittsfield Senators

Preceded by Reading Red Sox	Boston Red Sox; Double-A affiliate 1965–1969	Succeeded by Pawtucket Red Sox
