= Mystic Schooners =

New England collegiate baseball team

- Logo

Information
- League: NECBL (Southern Division)
- Location: Groton, CT (2011–2021; 2024–Present)
- Ballpark: Fitch Senior High School (2011–2021; 2024–present)
- Founded: 1994
- League championships: 2 (1994, 2016)
- Former name: Mystic Schooners (2011–present); Bristol Collegiate Baseball Club (2010); Pittsfield American Defenders (2009); Pittsfield/Berkshire Dukes (2004–2008); Eastern/Thread City Tides (1994–2003)
- Former leagues: NECBL; Southern Division (2002, 2004–2008); American Division (2001)
- Former ballparks: Senator Thomas J. Dodd Memorial Stadium (2022–2023); Muzzy Field (2010); Wahconah Park (2005–2009); Dan Duquette Sports Academy (2004); Eastern Baseball Stadium (1994–2003)
- Colors: Black, White, Blue
- Ownership: Dennis Long
- Management: Dennis Long (GM) (2012–present)
- Manager: Phil Orbe (2012–2017; 2019–present)
- Website: www.schoonersbaseball.com

The Mystic Schooners are a collegiate summer baseball team that operates in the Mystic, Connecticut region. The franchise is one of the two oldest franchises in the New England Collegiate Baseball League.

Originally known as the Eastern Tides, and later the Thread City Tides, playing in Willimantic, Connecticut, the franchise was purchased by former Boston Red Sox General Manager Dan Duquette in 2004. Duquette's club was first known as the Berkshire Dukes, playing their home games at the Dan Duquette Sports Academy in Hinsdale, Massachusetts. Duquette moved the team to nearby Pittsfield in 2005 after reaching a lease agreement with the city that brought the Dukes to historic Wahconah Park. In November 2008 the team changed its name to the Pittsfield American Defenders after the ownership group that owned the American Defenders of New Hampshire, which included Duquette, bought into the team.

The team had struggled to compete in the NECBL since moving to Berkshire County, and did not enjoy a winning season or a playoff berth until 2008. The team's level of play has rebounded greatly since the disastrous summer of 2005, where the Dukes finished at a league-worst 11–31, the fourth fewest wins in NECBL history. The Defenders' fan base has continued to grow despite the team's struggles on the field, with a reported home attendance of 28,955 in 2007, the fourth-highest in the league.

In December 2009, the Defenders were sold to the Bristol Collegiate Baseball Club which moved the original franchise back to its beginning state of Connecticut.

On January 14, 2009, it was announced that the team's nickname would be the Bristol Nine, and team general manager Dan Kennedy unveiled a logo featuring "...the old looking player and the old style hat and the man with the mustache and the whole nine yards." The logo's design was credited to Bristol resident Brian Rooney. Shortly thereafter, it was revealed that the logo in question was actually the trademarked property of Top of the Third, Incorporated, owners of a minor-professional baseball team in Visalia, California. The logo, the creation of graphic designer Dan Simon, had originally been used by the California League's Mudville Nine. The Bristol Nine name was then abandoned, with team management adopting the Bristol Collegiate Baseball Club brand.

Following a one-year stint in Bristol, the team moved to Mystic, Connecticut for the 2011 season and was rebranded as the Mystic Schooners.

== Franchise history ==
=== NECBL charter franchise and championships ===
The only remaining charter franchise in the NECBL, the Schooners began play as the Eastern Tides in 1994 in Willimantic, Connecticut. The team originally played home games at Eastern Connecticut State University. The NCAA Division III ballpark would remain the home of the Tides throughout their history in Connecticut. The New England Collegiate Baseball League was founded in 1993 as a five-team Connecticut league, where the Tides were the easternmost team, hence the name. Eastern was the only charter franchise to not take the name of its host community, Willimantic, which itself is a census-designated place in the town of Windham.

The first season for the Tides would result in the franchise's first and only league championship. 1994 was the first (and last) season in league history that used a point system to determine the league playoff contenders, modeled after the system used by the Cape Cod Baseball League. Eastern finished the first round in third place at 10-10, 5 games back of the first place Bristol Nighthawks. However, the second half of the season saw Eastern rebound to a 14–5 record (not including one tied ballgame that was never finished), good enough for first place, a game and a half ahead of the Middletown Giants. Overall, the Tides ended the regular season with a record of 27-17-1.

Eastern went on to defeat Bristol in the only best-of-five championship series in NECBL history. After falling in Game 1 3–2 at Bristol's Muzzy Field, Eastern rebounded to win the next two games at home, 3-2 and 3–1. The Tides traveled back to Bristol for Game 4, dropping the contest 4–3, before returning home to Eastern Connecticut State University's baseball field for a decisive Game 5, where the team crushed Bristol 11–2. University of New Haven catcher Bill Buscetto was the championship series MVP, batting .409 with 4 RBI. The win would crown the Eastern Tides as the first champions in NECBL history.

In 2016, the Mystic Schooners posted the best regular season record in the league (29-15) and won the Southern Division Championship by sweeping the Newport Gulls for the second year in a row. This set up a league championship series against the Sanford Mainers. Mystic swept the series behind all league players Nick Mascelli (Wagner College), Chase Lunceford (Louisiana Tech), Rich Slenker (Yale), Martin Figueroa (Rhode Island) and Toby Handley (Stony Brook) to win its second NECBL Championship.

=== Struggles at home ===
In 1995, the Tides again had a successful season, finishing in third place, at 19–21. Eastern fell in the first-ever league semi-finals, however, to the Waterbury Barons, two games to none. Tides player John Ellis, son of former Major League Baseball player John Charles Ellis was named to the NECBL All-League team, while fellow team member and Player of the Week Steven Hine went on to found the Steven Hine School of Baseball . Both members of the Tides later had minor league baseball careers.

The 1996 season began a long stretch of troubles for the Tides, as they finished in fifth place at 13–26, not qualifying for the postseason. In 1997, Eastern finished in sixth and last place, at 17–23. In those two seasons, Vermont assistant and future Manhattan and Maine head coach Steve Trimper served as the team's head coach. In 1998, at 15–27, the Tides again finished in sixth, though not in last place in the league.

The team's struggles fielding a competitive club continued in 1999, however, as the team once again finished in last - this time in eighth place in the NECBL. At 9-30, the Tides' 1999 season would stand as an embarrassing worst record in the league's history, 17 games back of first place. The Tides would finish seventh in 2000, with just 14 wins and 25 losses. As the franchise continued to falter on the field, so did the team's attendance. Before long, it became apparent that the team would not be able to support itself financially if things continued to progress as they were.

=== Final years in Willimantic ===
The 2001 saw renewed success for the Tides, and their first playoff appearance since 1995. After an 8-2 performance during the last 10 games of the regular season, the Tides finished at 14–16, good enough for second place in the NECBL's newly created American Division, just one game back of the Newport Gulls. Despite having the league's seventh ranked offense and facing the number one offense in Newport, Eastern fought the Gulls to 3 games in the American Division Finals, losing the first 8 to 7 at Newport but winning Game 2 at ECSU in walk-off fashion in the bottom of the 9th, 4–3, but in front of only 187 fans, many of whom traveled from Newport, Rhode Island. Eastern dropped Game 3 at Cardines Field after losing an early lead, 12-2 the final. The Gulls went on to defeat the Keene Swamp Bats in the finals for their franchise's first NECBL Championship.

In 2002, the Eastern Tides ownership changed the name to the Thread City Tides, both in an attempt to attract more fans and to honor the local thread industry that once produced the red stitching for baseballs. The Tides suffered a losing season once again, however, finishing in last place in the reorganized Southern Division at 10–32, 15 games behind first place Newport. Furthermore, home attendance was only one-third what it was on the road, averaging only 201 fans per game and totaling just 4226 for the season.

Average attendance dropped to just 183 fans for the 2003 season, where the Thread City Tides would complete their final year in Connecticut at 16-25 and again eliminated from playoff competition.

=== The Dukes era and the American Defenders ===
In the spring of 2008, the Dukes' lease of Wahconah Park was jeopardized when the city demanded thousands of dollars in back maintenance fees owed by the franchise. The situation was corrected, and the Dukes' lease of the park continued through the 2008 season.

Following the 2008 season, Duquette joined forces with Buddy Lewis and Jerry O'Connor, executives of Nocona Athletic Goods Company (also known as Nokona), and retired U.S. Navy Commander Terry Allvord, founder of the U.S. Military All-Stars "Red, White and Blue Tour", to create a new ownership group dedicated to providing opportunities for members of the United States' armed forces and military academies. The group changed the name to the Pittsfield American Defenders, which has a double meaning for the U.S. military (as defenders of America), and a new glove made by Nokona, called the American Defender. The new alignment of the ownership group featured instant growth to five teams, which included the American Defenders of New Hampshire of the Can-Am League, managed by former Red Sox Brian Daubach; the U.S. Military All-Stars "Red, White and Blue Tour" (Domestic); the U.S. Military All-Stars "Red, White and Blue Diplomacy Tour" (International); and the newly minted Latin Stars. The U.S. Military All-Stars continued their reputation as a patriotic force with impressive winning credentials. They posted a record of 31-6-1 against professional and summer collegiate programs. Over 20 tour players were offered professional contracts in 2009, making it an ideal source for future talent.

In their inaugural season, the Defenders were led by former ABCA Chairman and collegiate baseball legends Dr. Carroll Land and Coach Bob Warn assisted by Coach Ron Swen. Due to the timing of the new partnership and the desire to hold as many spots as possible for players from military schools and service academies, the roster was extremely late in taking shape. The military academies had a hard time believing a premier NECBL team was interested in dedicating their efforts to provide an opportunity for their players. Add to that a stadium under construction and at one point submerged under two feet of water, and Pittsfield faced every challenge imaginable. The overmatched roster posted a 13–25 record in the West Division.

=== Return to Connecticut ===
In 2010, the New England Collegiate Baseball League Board of Directors approved the sale of the Pittsfield American Defenders to the Bristol Collegiate Baseball Club. The new ownership group moved the team to Bristol, Connecticut and played their inaugural games in Bristol at Muzzy Field as the Bristol Collegiate Baseball Club. The stay in Bristol was short lived, however, as after the first season in Bristol, the owners decided to move the team to the Mystic, CT market where the team was rebranded the Mystic Schooners. In 11 seasons, the team has qualified for the playoffs 9 times and won the Southern Division title twice (2015, 2016). After losing to the Vermont Mountaineers in the 2015 championship series, the Schooners won their first NECBL Championship in 2016, defeating the Sanford Mainers. Following the league's restructuring into three divisions prior to the 2022 season, the team competed in the Coastal Division. In 2025, the league returned to a two division format, and the Schooners were placed in the South Division.

The team briefly moved to Dodd Stadium in Norwich, CT from 2022-2023 and, as of 2024, have since moved back to their previous home, Fitch Senior High School in Groton, CT.

== Postseason appearances ==
Year	Division Semi-Finals*		Division Finals*		NECBL Championship Series	
Eastern Tides
1994					Bristol Nighthawks	W (3-2)
1995			Waterbury Barons	L (0-2)		
2001			Newport Gulls	L (1-2)		
Thread City Tides
Berkshire/Pittsfield Dukes
2008	North Adams SteepleCats	W (2-0)	Newport Gulls	L (0-2)		
Pittsfield American Defenders
Bristol Collegiate
2010	Danbury Westerners	L (1-2)				
Mystic Schooners
2013	Ocean State Waves	W (2-0)	Newport Gulls	L (0-2)		
2014	Plymouth Pilgrims	L (0-2)				
2015	New Bedford Bay Sox	W (2-0)	Newport Gulls	W (2-0)	Vermont Mountaineers	L (1-2)
2016	New Bedford Bay Sox	W (2-1)	Newport Gulls	W (2-0)	Sanford Mainers	W (2-0)
2025	Newport Gulls	L (1-2)				
2026	Martha's Vineyard Sharks	W (2-1)	Danbury Westerners	L (1-2)		

*The NECBL did not separate into divisions until 2001. In 1994, a points system was used. From 1995 - 2000, the top four teams played each other in a league semi-final. In 2001, only 2 teams from each division qualified for the playoffs.

== Individual and team achievements ==
The 2012 team hold the NECBL season records for highest ERA (7.22), most runs allowed (313), and most earned runs allowed (263). The 2017 team shares the NECBL single-season record for shutouts (10) with Upper Valley.

In 2017, pitcher Sonny Potter threw a no-hitter.

In 2019, T.T. Bowens set the NECBL single-season record for runs batted in (53).

NECBL Annual Award Winners
Name	Year	Award
Joel Rosencrance	2013	Sportsman of the Year
Steve Laurino	2014	Batting Champion
Willie Rios	2015	Stephen Strasburg Top Pro Prospect
Aaron Hill	2015	Sportsman of the Year
Rich Slenker	2016	Most Improved Player
Tommy Jew	2017	Stephen Strasburg Top Pro Prospect
Tommy Jew	2017	Rick Ligi League MVP
T.T. Bowens	2019	All-Star Game Home Run Derby Winner
T.T. Bowens	2019	Stephen Strasburg Top Pro Prospect
T.T. Bowens	2019	Rick Ligi League MVP
Michael Caruso	2019	Sportsman of the Year
David Beam	2019	Rookie of the Year
Addison Kopack	2021	Christopher Ashmos 10th Player
Mason LaPlante	2022	Defensive Player of the Year

== Notable alumni ==
Players who have continued on to professional baseball careers include:

Player	Details	Notes
Mark Bordonaro	Selected in the 25th round of the 2012 MLB draft by the Seattle Mariners	
**Joe Hudson**	Selected in the 6th round of the 2012 MLB draft by the Cincinnati Reds	Has appeared in 18 major league games with the Los Angeles Angels, St. Louis Cardinals, and Seattle Mariners
Matt Alvarez	Signed with the Kansas City Royals as an undrafted free agent in 2013	
Colin O'Keefe	Selected in the 33rd round of the 2013 MLB draft by the Los Angeles Angels	
Ryan Lindemuth	Selected in the 20th round of the 2013 MLB draft by the Pittsburgh Pirates; Selected in the 37th round of the 2014 MLB draft by the New York Yankees	
John Murphy	Selected in the 6th round of the 2013 MLB draft by the New York Yankees	Currently an assistant coach at Boston College
Jake Romanski	Selected in the 14th round of the 2013 MLB draft by the Boston Red Sox	Was suspended 100 games in 2018 due to a positive amphetamine test
Mike Fransoso	Selected in the 27th round of the 2013 MLB draft by the Pittsburgh Pirates	
Craig Schlitter	Selected in the 27th round of the 2014 MLB draft by the Colorado Rockies	
Tom Gavitt	Selected in the 19th round of the 2014 MLB draft by the Oakland Athletics	
Jose Lopez	Selected in the 6th round of the 2014 MLB draft by the Cincinnati Reds	
Jordan Schwartz	Selected in the 4th round of the 2014 MLB draft by the Oakland Athletics	
Kevin Carlow	Signed with the St. Louis Cardinals as an undrafted free agent in 2014	
Alec Keller	Selected in the 17th round of the 2014 MLB draft by the Washington Nationals	
Zach Albin	Selected in the 20th round of the 2014 MLB draft by the Baltimore Orioles	
Garrett Kennedy	Selected in the 14th round of the 2015 MLB draft by the Los Angeles Dodgers	
Brad Zunica	Selected in the 15th round of the 2015 MLB draft by the San Diego Padres	
Nolan Long	Selected in the 16th round of the 2015 MLB draft by the Los Angeles Dodgers	
Steve Laurino	Selected in the 25th round of the 2015 MLB draft by the Baltimore Orioles	
Alex Vargas	Selected in the 39th round of the 2015 MLB draft by the Houston Astros	
J.R. Davis	Selected in the 15th round of the 2016 MLB draft by the St. Louis Cardinals	
Willie Rios	Selected in the 16th round of the 2016 MLB draft by the Baltimore Orioles	
D.J. Jenkins	Selected in the 26th round of the 2016 MLB draft by the Los Angeles Angels	
Mike O’Reilly	Selected in the 27th round of the 2016 MLB draft by the St. Louis Cardinals	
Ben Ruta	Selected in the 30th round of the 2016 MLB draft by the New York Yankees	
Toby Handley	Selected in the 30th round of the 2016 MLB draft by the Houston Astros	
Chase Livingston	Selected in the 39th round of the 2016 MLB draft by the Kansas City Royals	
**Jason Foley**	Signed with the Detroit Tigers as an undrafted free agent in 2016	Made his major league debut with the Tigers in 2021 and has appeared in 71 major league games as of the end of the 2022 season
**Jake Meyers**	Selected in the 13th round of the 2017 MLB draft by the Houston Astros	Made his major league debut with Astros in 2021 Member of the 2022 World Series championship team
Jesse Berardi	Selected in the 10th round of the 2017 MLB draft by the Cleveland Guardians	
Jesse Lepore	Selected in the 24th round of the 2017 MLB draft by the Colorado Rockies	
Carson Teel	Selected in the 37th round of the 2017 MLB draft by the Boston Red Sox and in the 16th round of the 2018 MLB draft by the Washington Nationals	
Martin Figueroa	Selected in the 32nd round of the 2017 MLB draft by the Houston Astros	
Rich Slenker	Selected in the 28th round of the 2017 MLB draft by the Houston Astros	
Doug Domnarski	Selected in the 27th round of the 2017 MLB draft by the Miami Marlins	
Brett Bond	Selected in the 23rd round of the 2017 MLB draft by the Houston Astros and signed with the Los Angeles Angels as a free agent in 2018	
**Tim Cate**	Selected in the 2nd round of the 2018 MLB draft by the Washington Nationals	
Ryan Ramiz	Selected in the 23rd round of the 2018 MLB draft by the Seattle Mariners	Currently a volunteer assistant coach at Seton Hall University
Kevin Magee	Selected in the 9th round of the 2018 MLB draft by the Baltimore Orioles	
**Brian Rey**	Selected in the 13th round of the 2018 MLB draft by the Cincinnati Reds	
Tommy Jew	Selected in the 13th round of the 2019 MLB draft by the St. Louis Cardinals	
**Ryan Smith**	Selected in the 18th round of the 2019 MLB draft by the Los Angeles Angels	
**Kumar Nambiar**	Selected in the 34th round of the 2019 MLB draft by the Oakland Athletics	
**Tucker Flint**	Selected in the 36th round of the 2019 MLB draft by the Los Angeles Angels	
Kaleb Foster	Signed with the Pittsburgh Pirates as an undrafted free agent in 2019	
**T.T. Bowens**	Signed with the Baltimore Orioles as an undrafted free agent in 2020	
**Rohan Handa**	Selected in the 5th round of the 2021 MLB draft by the San Francisco Giants	
Mike Adams	Signed with the Philadelphia Phillies as an undrafted free agent in 2021	
Active MiLB and MLB players are indicated in **bold**.

Dai Dai Otaka, who played for the team in 2019, previously worked in player development for the Houston Astros and is currently the minor league infield coordinator for the Chicago Cubs.
