= Pittsfield Electrics (Canadian–American League) =

The Pittsfield Electrics were a Canadian–American League (Class C) baseball team in Pittsfield, Massachusetts from 1941 to 1951. From 1949 to 1950 they played as the Pittsfield Indians and in 1951 as the Pittsfield Phillies.

Their home field was Wahconah Park.

== Future Major League Electrics ==
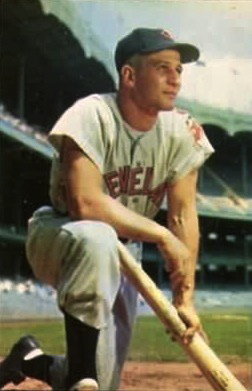
Al Rosen

- Jorge Comellas (1941)
- John O'Neil (1942)
- Al Rosen (1946)
- Hal Naragon (1947)
- Jim Lemon (1948)
- Brooks Lawrence (1950)
- Stan Pawloski (1950)
- Dick Tomanek (1950)

== Electrics with previous Major League experience ==
- Bill Holland (1941)
- Glenn Spencer (1941)
- Tony Rensa (1946–1947)
- Gene Hasson (1948–1949)
- Lloyd Brown (1950)
