= United States Navy Baseball =

The modern United States Navy Baseball Club was founded by retired U.S. Navy Commander Terry Allvord in Pensacola, Florida in 1990 before moving to San Diego for the 1993 season. This program is the leader in armed forces baseball in the modern era. Allvord went on to establish over 40 single-service armed forces teams in every branch of the military around the globe.

Tryouts are held every year to compete as the U.S. Military All-Stars during the annual Red White and Blue Tour. The team features active duty, reserve, veterans, Delayed Entry Program, and first responders. The continuation of two wars limited the availability of armed forces players.

Beginning in 2010, the team would be known as the Heroes of the Diamond, allowing a limited number of former MLB, current professional, summer collegiate, and first responders the opportunity to join the tour. Players continue to pay their own expenses while off-duty to compete against professional, independent and summer collegiate programs around the world.

== Mission statement ==
To promote the awareness of Americans in support of the honorable sacrifices our armed forces make at the tip of the spear.

== History ==
The origin of United States Armed Forces Baseball has been traced as far back as the American Civil War (1860–1865). For over a century, military baseball has been utilized as a successful tool to improve recruiting efforts and the morale of both the armed services and the American people.

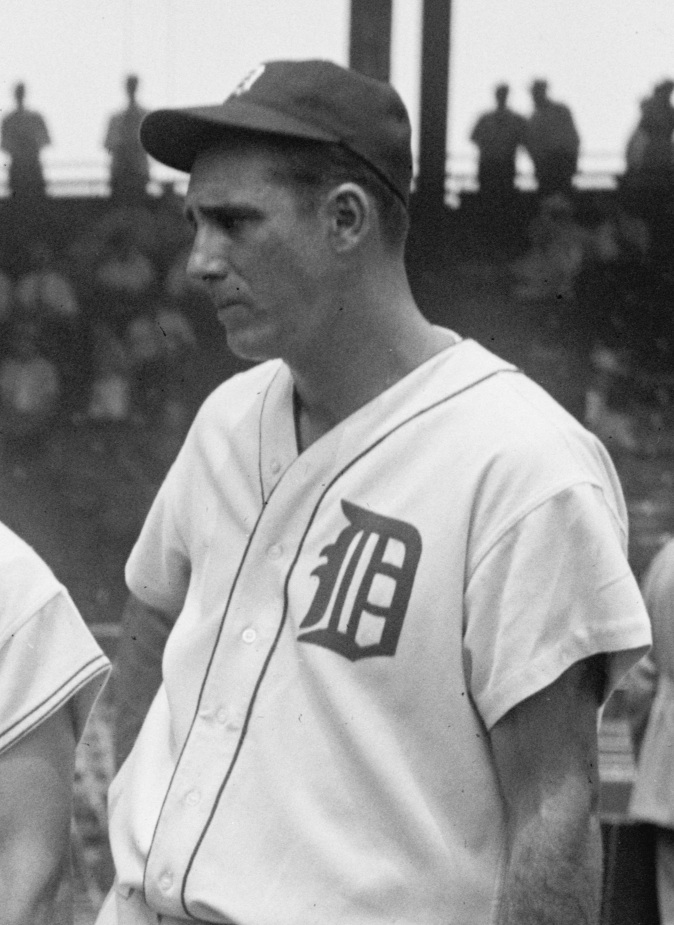
Hank Greenberg, Hall of Famer and 2-time MVP

Following World War I, major league stars such as Ty Cobb and Christy Mathewson served their country while playing on teams overseas and at home. Military baseball reached its peak of popularity during World War II (1941–1945) as baseball legends Ted Williams, Joe DiMaggio, Hank Greenberg and Bob Feller headed the list of major league professionals playing on service teams. Military baseball also served as a conduit to post-war reconstruction efforts and international relations most notably in Japan.

Military baseball support was extremely limited in scope during the Korean War (1950–1952) and finally, the Vietnam War (1965–1974), when politicians began the systematic dismantling of the military infrastructure and force strength. Baseball was slowly phased out and went dormant along with the decline of the armed forces.

=== Modern era ===
In 1990, the United States experienced a renaissance of organized military baseball. Re-organization efforts began after a U.S. Navy program was founded in Pensacola, Florida. That initial navy program led Allvord to establish teams in every branch and ensure the growth of teams around the world.

Today, the Heroes of the Diamond are the largest, fastest growing and most successful joint military program in the world. Over 25,000 personnel have participated since 1990. In 2003, an episode of the CBS television show JAG was based on the programs annual Navy-Marine Corps All-Star Game featuring 2002 Cy Young Award winner and Oakland Athletics pitcher Barry Zito. In 2006, the team posted a 41 and 6 record. This remains the best performance in the history of the program and featured a 4 and 2 overall record against teams in the independent professional Golden Baseball League.

Following the 2008 season, Allvord joined forces with former Boston Red Sox general manager Dan Duquette and Nokona Athletic Goods Company executives Buddy Lewis and Jerry O'Connor to create a new ownership group dedicated to providing opportunities for members of the U.S. Armed Forces and military academies. The new alignment created four teams at every level of baseball to create a unique farm system. These teams consisted of the American Defenders of New Hampshire of the Can-Am League, managed by former Red Sox Brian Daubach, both domestic and international U.S. Military All-Stars Red White and Blue Tour, managed by former major league first baseman Ivan Cruz, and the Latin Stars led by Ramssey Ochoa. The tour teams built a winning percentage of .720 over two decades. In 2009, over 20 tour players were offered professional contracts, posting a record of 31, 6 and 1 against professional and summer collegiate programs.

The Pittsfield American Defenders, whose name has a double meaning as defenders of America, and for a new glove made by Nokona, called the American Defender. , The Defenders were led by former ABCA chairman and collegiate baseball legends Dr. Carroll Land and coach Bob Warn assisted by coach Ron Swen. Due to the timing of the new partnership and the desire to hold as many spots as possible for players from military schools and service academies the roster was extremely late in taking shape. The military academies had a hard time believing a premier New England Collegiate Baseball League team was interested in dedicating their efforts to provide an opportunity for their players. Add to that, a stadium under construction and at one point submerged under two feet of water, and Pittsfield was faced with many challenges.

== Navy-Marine All-Star Game ==
For 10 years, the Navy-Marine All-Star Game was played each summer immediately following a San Diego Padres contest and dedicated to Pearl Harbor survivor Commander Lawrence S. Jackman, U.S. Navy. The most valuable player award is dedicated to Lieutenant Colonel Daniel Wayne Kidd, USMC, who was killed in the line of duty while stationed at Camp Pendleton in March 1996. The current record for the annual contest is a 9–9 tie between the Navy and Marine Corps. The most recent contest in 2007 was claimed by the U.S. Military All-Stars defeating the Marine Corps 12–1 and played at Tony Gwynn Stadium, San Diego State University.

== See also ==
- Navy Midshipmen baseball
