= Pittsfield Electrics =

Pittsfield Electrics may refer to:

- Pittsfield Electrics (Eastern Association)
- Pittsfield Electrics (Canadian-American League)
