= Pittsfield Suns =

American collegiate baseball team

Logo
Cap insignia

Information
- League: FCBL (2012–2023)
- Location: Pittsfield, Massachusetts, U.S.
- Ballpark: Wahconah Park
- Founded: 2012
- Ownership: Goldklang Group
- General manager: Sander Stotland

The Pittsfield Suns are an inactive summer collegiate baseball team based in Pittsfield, Massachusetts. The team competed in the New England-based Futures Collegiate Baseball League (FCBL) from 2012 through 2023. The team's home ballpark is Wahconah Park in Pittsfield.

== Team history ==
Jamie Keefe, previously the general manager of the Pittsfield Colonials, was named as the first general manager of the Pittsfield Suns ahead of when they began play in the 2012 FCBL season. Keefe had been the Can-Am League's Manager of the Year in 2011.

The Suns did not play the 2024 season due to Wahconah Park requiring renovations. The team was temporarily replaced by a travel team known as the Futures League Road Warriors. In August 2024, it was announced the Suns also would not play in 2025 due to the renovations not being completed. In December 2025, it was reported that Pittsfield's parks commission reached an agreement with the Suns such that "the two will work together when the historic ballpark is renovated."

With the grandstand of Wahconah Park set to be demolished starting in April 2026, the team's future remains uncertain.

== Postseason appearances ==
=== FCBL ===
- 2013 Old Orchard Beach Raging Tide (L) 0-1
- 2014 Brockton Rox (W) 8–3, Worcester Bravehearts (L) 0-2
- 2021 Defeated the Brockton Rox two games to one.
- 2021 Lost to the Vermont Lake Monsters two games to one in championship series.

The FCBL changed its postseason to a two-round format starting in the 2012 season
A one-game play-in round was added in the 2013 season
