= Locklin =

Locklin is a surname. Notable people with the surname include:

- Billy Ray Locklin (born 1936), American football defensive lineman
- Gerald Locklin, American poet
- Hank Locklin (1918–2009), American country music singer-songwriter
- Kerry Locklin (born 1959), Canadian football defensive line coach
- Loryn Locklin (born 1968), American actress
- Stu Locklin (1928–2016), American Major League Baseball outfielder
