= Dan Duquette =

Baseball executive

- General manager
- Born: May 26, 1958 (age 68); Dalton, Massachusetts, U.S.
- Stats at Baseball Reference

Teams
- Milwaukee Brewers (1980–1987); Montreal Expos (1987–1994); Boston Red Sox (1994–2002); Baltimore Orioles (2011–2018)

Career highlights and awards
- 2× Sporting News Executive of the Year; 2x Executive of the Year 1995 and 2014 by the BBWA; Executive of the Year 2014 by Baseball America; Boston Red Sox Hall of Fame

Dan Duquette (born May 26, 1958) is a former American baseball executive. He is the former general manager of the Montreal Expos, Boston Red Sox, and Baltimore Orioles of Major League Baseball. He is also the founder of the Dan Duquette Sports Academy. He has twice been named the Major League Baseball Executive of the Year by Sporting News (1992 with the Expos and 2014 with the Orioles).

== Early life and education ==
Duquette is a native of Dalton, Massachusetts. He attended a Catholic grammar school in Dalton during which time he was a batboy for the Wahconah Regional High School baseball team. In high school, he was the captain of both the baseball and football teams. After high school, he attended Amherst College where he was a catcher on the varsity baseball team and a linebacker on the football team. In the summer of 1977 at the age of 19, Duquette helped organize the Dalton Collegians, a semi-pro baseball team that operated out of his hometown. In college, Duquette was chosen to the 1979 Boston Herald American All New England College Division All Star team. Duquette was also known to talk to professional scouts who attended Amherst baseball games. He graduated from college in 1980.

== Career ==
=== Early career and Montreal Expos ===
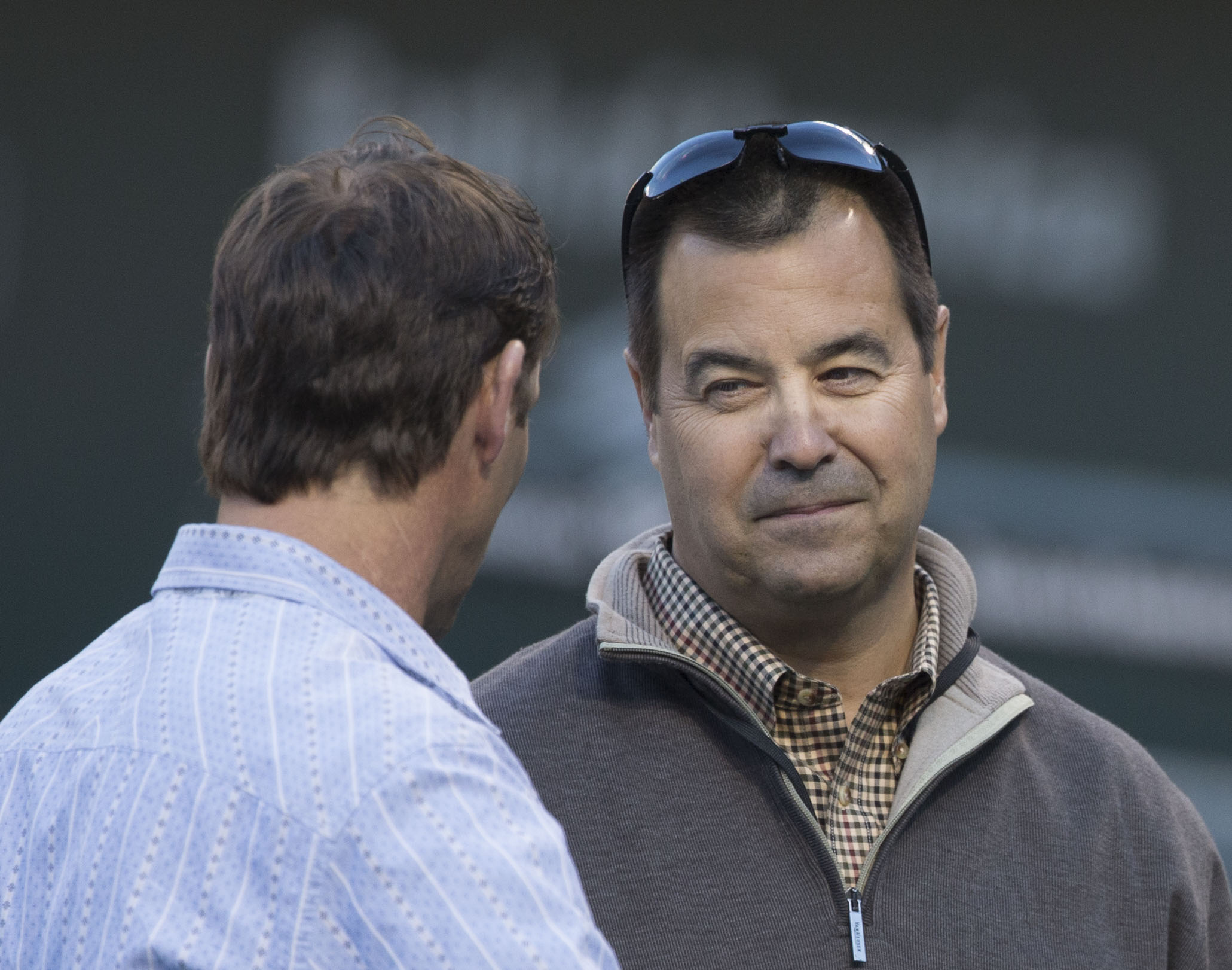
Duquette in April 2015

After college, Duquette's baseball coach, Bill Thurston, recommended him to Harry Dalton, a fellow Amherst alumnus and general manager of the Milwaukee Brewers. Duquette became a scouting assistant for the Brewers and worked in the scouting department for seven years.

In 1987, the Montreal Expos hired Duquette as the director of player development. He spent a few years in that position before being promoted to vice-president and general manager in 1991 (taking over for the departing Dave Dombrowski). Over the course of his six years with the Expos, Duquette had a hand in drafting players like Rondell White, Marquis Grissom, Cliff Floyd, Jose Vidro, Kirk Reuter, Javier Vasquez, and many more Major League players. He also signed players like Vladimir Guerrero, John Wetteland, and Larry Walker. In November 1993, Duquette traded second baseman Delino DeShields for Pedro Martínez of the Los Angeles Dodgers. The Expos were competitive from 1992 to 1994, and they had attained the best record in baseball prior to the 1994–95 Major League Baseball strike that ended the season prematurely.

=== Boston Red Sox ===
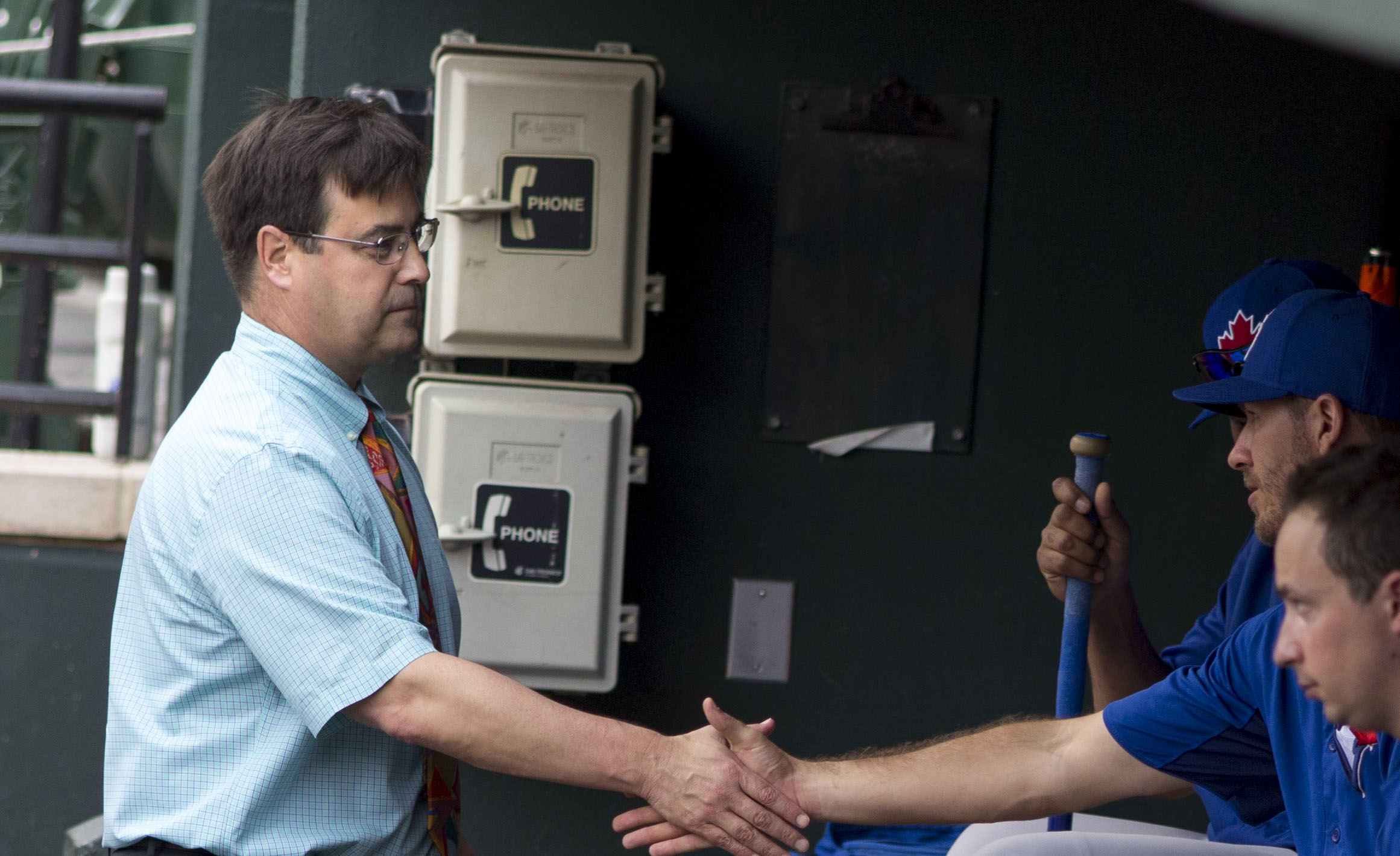
Duquette shaking hands with Toronto Blue Jays players in their dugout prior to a game on July 13, 2013

In 1994, Duquette returned to Massachusetts to become the general manager of the Boston Red Sox. He spent eight years at the helm of his hometown team. The Red Sox achieved a record of 656–574 under Duquette, setting attendance records and appeared in the playoffs in 1995, 1998, and 1999). The team won the American League East division in 1995, but only advanced as far as the American League Championship Series once in their three postseason years. They would lose that series to the rival New York Yankees.

As the Red Sox GM, Duquette made several notable moves, including drafting Nomar Garciaparra in 1994 and trading for Pedro Martínez in 1997 (and signing him to a six-year, $75 million contract). He is also known for letting Roger Clemens leave in free agency in 1996.

Many of the players that Duquette drafted or signed were on the Red Sox 2004 World Series championship team. He is largely considered to have laid the groundwork for that team by signing, drafting or trading for players like Tim Wakefield, Johnny Damon, Jason Varitek, Manny Ramirez, Derek Lowe, and Kevin Youkilis. In 2002, Duquette was dismissed from his general manager post less than 24 hours after the Red Sox had officially been sold to a new ownership group that included John W. Henry and Tom Werner.

=== After Boston ===
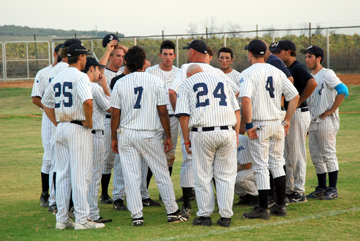
The Bet Shemesh Blue Sox in a team huddle in 2007, one of six teams to play in the inaugural season of the Israel Baseball League

After his stint with the Red Sox, Duquette largely stayed out of Major League Baseball for 9 years. In 2003, he opened the Dan Duquette Sports Academy, a sports training center in Hinsdale, Massachusetts designed for children aged 8 to 18. In 2004, he became the owner of the New England Collegiate Baseball League's Pittsfield Dukes (later the Pittsfield American Defenders and now the Mystic Schooners). During his ownership tenure, the Dukes/American Defenders played at his sports academy in Hinsdale and later at Wahconah Park in Pittsfield. In 2008, he was part of an ownership group that included Buddy Lewis, Terry Allvord, and Jerry O'Connor that purchased what would become known as the American Defenders of New Hampshire, (later the Pittsfield Colonials). He relinquished ownership of both clubs in 2009 and 2010. Duquette also helped found the Israel Baseball League. Despite folding after only one season, it helped 75 players get into professional baseball. During this time, he also had a part in a production of the musical, Damn Yankees, in Western Massachusetts.

=== Baltimore Orioles ===
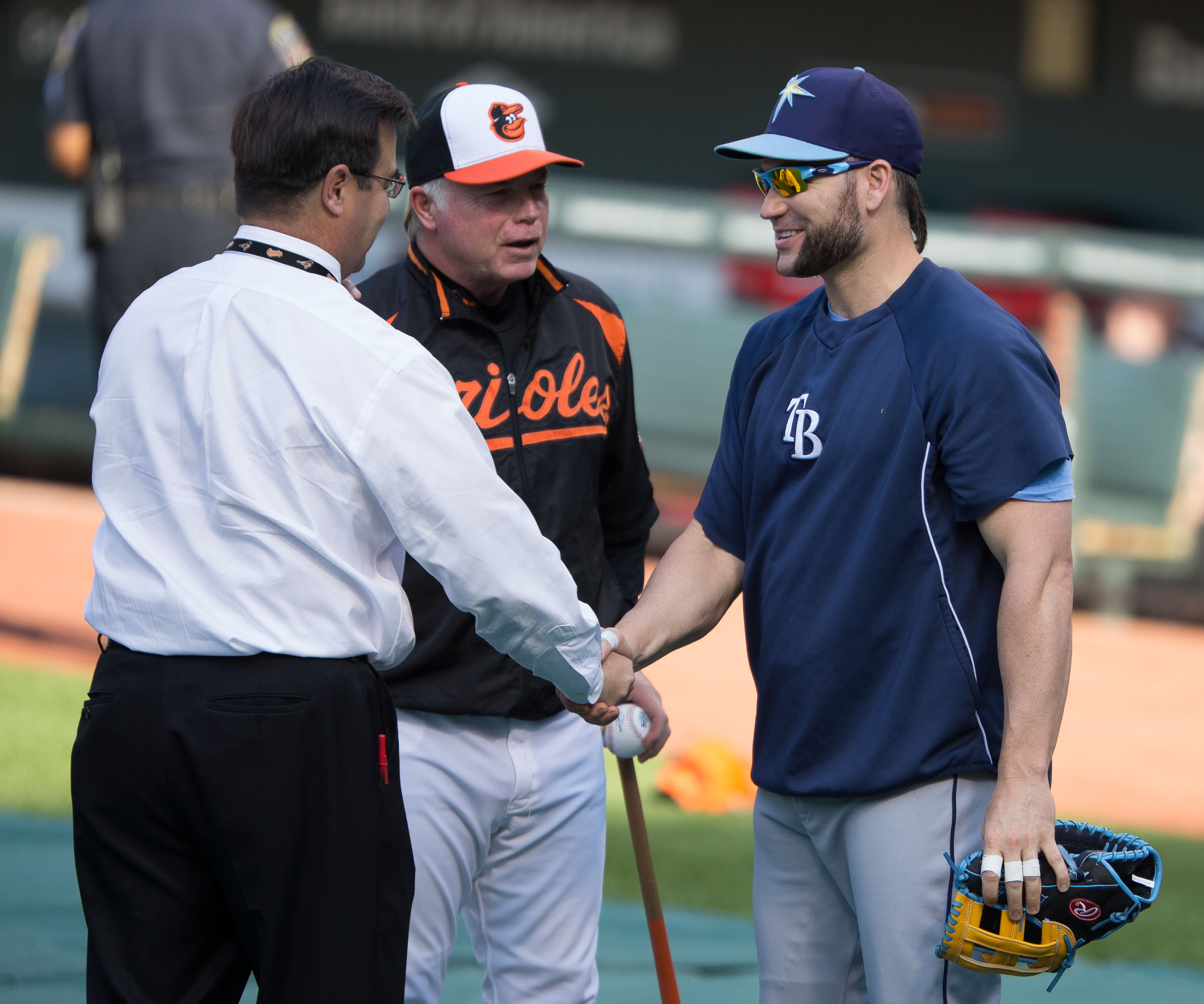
Duquette (left) with Buck Showalter (middle) and Luke Scott (right) before a game on May 17, 2013

After spending 9 years away from MLB, Duquette returned as the general manager of the Baltimore Orioles in November 2011. In 2012, the team made the playoffs for the first time since 1997. In 2014, the Orioles won the American League East with 96 wins and made it to the American League Championship Series.

Many people attribute the success of the Orioles to the management of Buck Showalter and Duquette. Duquette signed Nelson Cruz to one-year, $8 million contract in February 2014. Cruz went on to lead the league in home runs that year. Other signings and acquisitions under Duquette have included, Nick Hundley, Delmon Young, Steve Pearce, and Andrew Miller.

In early 2015, the Toronto Blue Jays expressed interest in making Duquette their new President/CEO. Because Duquette was under contract until 2018 and the Blue Jays did not offer enough compensation to the Orioles, no deal was struck.

On October 3, 2018, the Orioles decided not to renew the contract of Duquette after two straight losing seasons, in 2018 the Orioles went 47–115, the worst record in franchise history. Both Duquette and Showalter had contracts that expired at the end of the season.

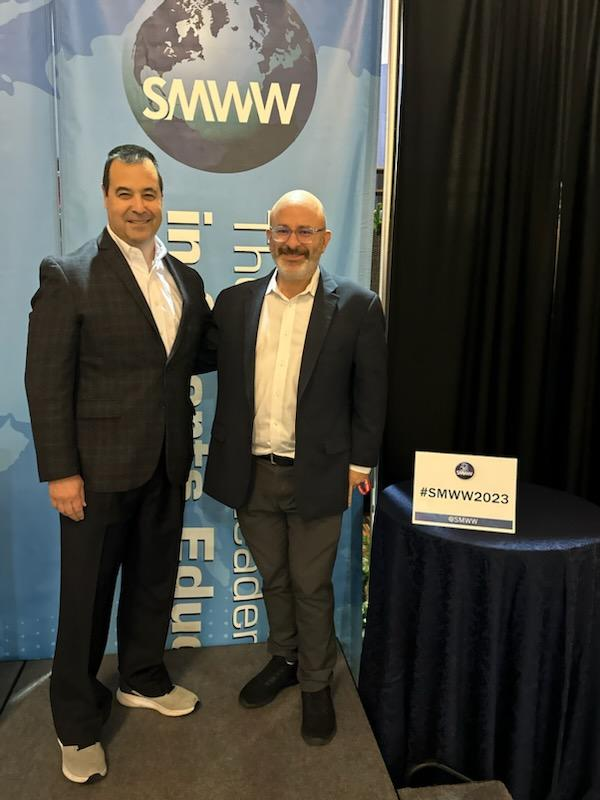
Dan Duquette (left) and Ari Kaplan (right) at the 2023 SMWW Baseball Career Conference in Nashville

Currently Duquette is a Baseball Player Development instructor for the online sports-career training school Sports Management Worldwide.

== Sports academy ==
The Dan Duquette Sports Academy is a sports training center located in Hinsdale, Massachusetts, in the United States. The academy provides overnight and day camp with one- and two-week sessions for boys and girls ages 8 to 18. The academy features camps for baseball, softball, basketball, soccer and football. The Sports Academy also sponsors weekend tournaments for youth baseball teams ranging in age from 9U to 19U.

There are three different sized baseball fields, four basketball courts, volleyball court, horseshoe pits, a 2-acre (1 ha) campsite on a spring fed fresh water lake for canoeing and kayaking and 80 acres (32 ha) of hiking trails. The camp uses latest technology, including digital teaching devices, enhances the training experience. The baseball field at the Sports Academy also served as the temporary home of the Berkshire Dukes of the New England Collegiate Baseball League in 2004 prior to the team moving to its permanent home at Pittsfield, Massachusetts' Wahconah Park.

== Recognition and awards ==
Duquette has twice received The Sporting News Executive of the Year Award (1992 with the Expos and 2014 with the Orioles). He also won the Baseball America Major League Executive of the Year honor in 2014 with the Orioles. Mark Armour and Daniel Levitt ranked Duquette the 17th best general manager in the history of baseball in their 2015 book, In Pursuit of Pennants: Baseball Operations from Deadball to Moneyball.

On May 26, 2022, Dan Duquette was inducted into the Red Sox Hall of Fame via a special awards ceremony, hosted by the Boston Red Sox and Red Sox Foundation, at Fenway Park. Duquette was inducted alongside David Ortiz, Manny Ramirez, Rich Gedman, and Bill Dinneen.

== Personal life ==
Duquette is married to Amy Aubry-Duquette and has seven children. He lived in Acton, Massachusetts, from 1994 through 2011. He currently lives in Sandwich, Massachusetts. Duquette's cousin, Jim Duquette, is a former executive of the Baltimore Orioles and the New York Mets. His other cousin, Pat Duquette (Jim's brother), is the head men's basketball coach at UMass Lowell.
