= Kenny Kuhn =

American baseball player (1937–2010)

- Infielder
- Born: March 20, 1937; Louisville, Kentucky, U.S.
- Died: July 16, 2010 (aged 73); Layton, Utah, U.S.
- Batted: Left Threw: Right

MLB debut
- July 7, 1955, for the Cleveland Indians

Last MLB appearance
- September 29, 1957, for the Cleveland Indians

MLB statistics
- Batting average: .210
- Home runs: 0
- Runs batted in: 7
- Stats at Baseball Reference

Teams
- Cleveland Indians (1955–1957)

Kenneth Harold Kuhn (March 20, 1937 – July 16, 2010) was an American infielder in Major League Baseball for three seasons. He played for the Cleveland Indians from 1955 to 1957, playing mostly as a shortstop and second baseman, and was classified as a "Bonus Baby".

== Early life ==
Kuhn was a four-sport star (baseball, football, basketball, and track) at Louisville Male High School, noted in 1955 (before Muhammad Ali), as "possibly the greatest all-around athlete ever to come out of Louisville."

== Baseball career ==
After his major league career, he played minor league baseball until 1963, including the Dallas Rangers of the Texas League.

== Later life ==
After retirement from baseball Kuhn worked for various companies, including Kentucky Fried Chicken, Mister Donut and Children's Discovery Centers. In 1999 he moved to Truckee, California and worked at a Lake Tahoe resort.

He died, aged 73, in Layton, Utah, from pancreatic cancer. He was survived by wife Peggy and their four children, Carrie, Amy, Scott and Stan.
