= Darren Bush =

American baseball player & coach (born 1974)

Athletics – No. 51
- Bench Coach
- Born: January 18, 1974 (age 51); Columbus, Ohio, U.S.
- Bats: Left Throws: Right

Teams
- As coach: Oakland Athletics / Athletics (2013–present)

Darren James Bush (born January 18, 1974) is an American professional baseball former player and current coach. He is the bench coach for the Athletics of Major League Baseball (MLB). Bush has two kids, Wyatt and Maggie.

== Career ==
Bush attended Dunedin High School in Dunedin, Florida, and Valdosta State University, where he played college baseball for the Valdosta State Blazers. A former outfielder and catcher, he played in minor league baseball from 1996 through 2002, spending the first three seasons of his career in the independent Frontier League before playing in the San Diego Padres organization in 1999 and 2000, and the Philadelphia Phillies organization in 2001. He was named to the Frontier League's all-star team for its tenth anniversary.

Bush managed in independent league baseball for the Yuba-Sutter Gold Sox of the Western Baseball League in 2002, the Berkshire Black Bears of the Northeast League in 2003, and the Quebec Capitales of the Northeast League in 2004. He joined the Oakland Athletics, working in their minor league system as the hitting coach of the Stockton Ports of the Class A-Advanced California League, in 2005. He became Stockton's manager in 2007, and led them to the California League championship in 2008. He then managed the Midland RockHounds of the Class AA Texas League in 2009 and 2010, leading them to the 2009 Texas League championship. He managed the Sacramento River Cats of the Class AAA Pacific Coast League, winning division titles in 2011 and 2012.

The Athletics named Bush their bullpen coach prior to the 2013 season. After the 2014 season, hitting coach Chili Davis left the Athletics to serve as hitting coach of the Boston Red Sox; the Athletics promoted Bush to replace Davis. He became the Athletics' third base coach for the 2022 season and their bench coach before the 2023 season.
