= Terry Allvord =

American sports industry executive

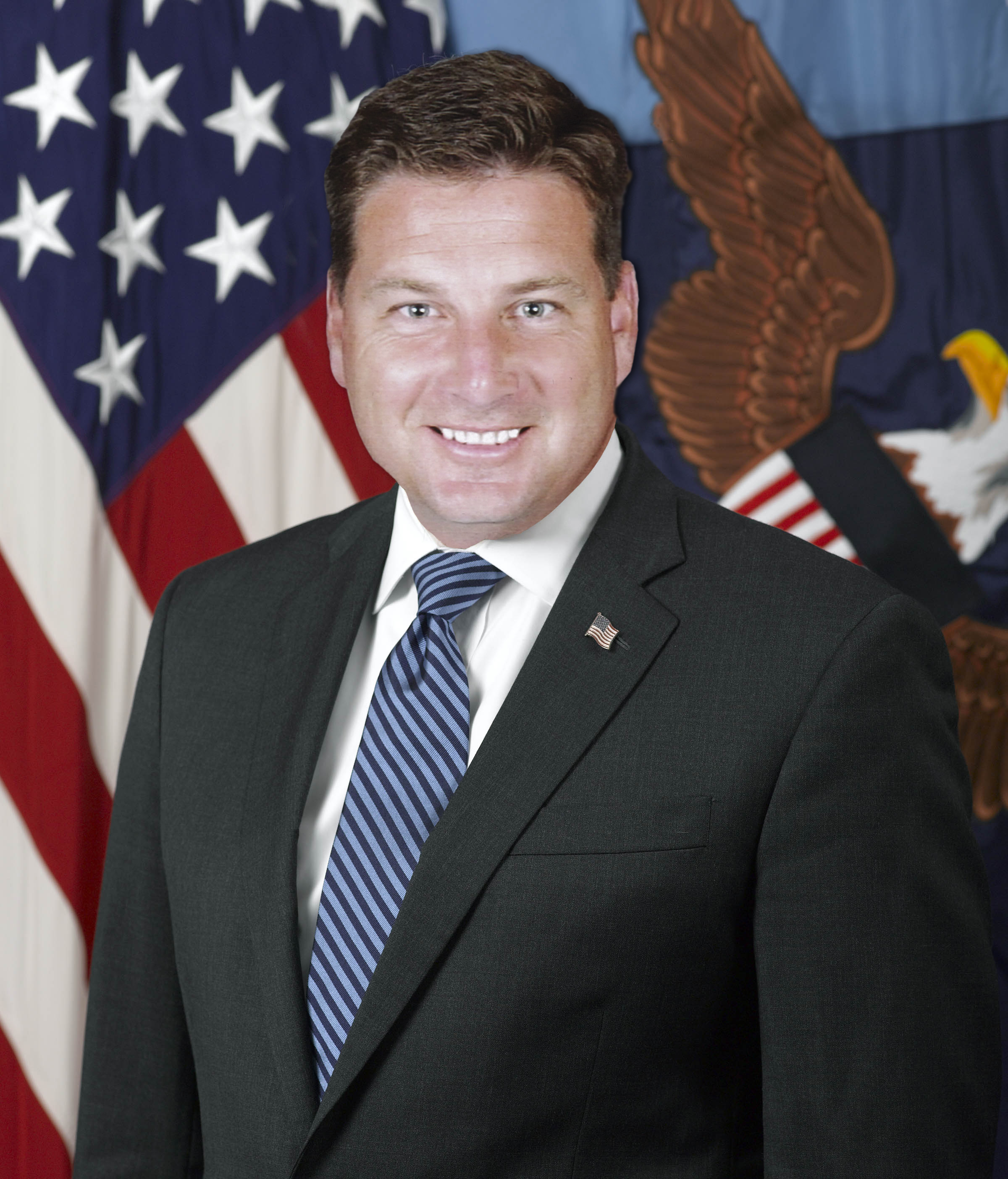

Personal details
- Education: Naval Air Station Pensacola
- Awards: Veterans Advantage Hero Vet.

Military service
- Allegiance: United States of America
- Branch/service: United States Navy
- Rank: Lieutenant commander

Terry Allvord is an American sports industry executive. He was in the U.S. Navy, where he rose to the rank of lieutenant commander.

== Naval career ==
Allvord graduated from Canyon High School in California. He was a flight student at the Naval Air Station in Pensacola, Florida.

When he retired he became an executive of the Nocona Athletic Goods Company and of Boston Baseball All-Stars, which owned the short-lived American Defenders of New Hampshire team.

== Sports ==
Allvord founded the National Search and Rescue Competition for search-and-rescue professionals from all parts of the world.

In 1990, while an ensign at the Naval Air Station, Allvord started the U.S. Navy Baseball Club, also known as the Southwestern Baseball League, following a visit by President George H. W. Bush to the National Museum of Naval Aviation in Pensacola. He later started more than forty military teams, the U.S. Military All-Stars, and the Red, White and Blue Tour3. He was a baseball coach at the Naval Academy Preparatory School in Newport, Rhode Island.

== Honors ==
In 2003, he was selected as a Veterans Advantage Hero Vet.

== Publications ==
- as "Crash Allvord": Heroes of the Diamond. Mascot Books (2011) ISBN 978-1936319510
