= Ed Scott (baseball scout) =

American baseball scout (1917–2010)

Edward Scott Sr. (October 17, 1917 – January 11, 2010) was an American baseball scout. Before he became the first African-American scout in the history of the Boston Red Sox of Major League Baseball, Scott was a talent-spotter for the Negro leagues, and he signed Henry Aaron, the Baseball Hall of Famer and future home run king, to Aaron's first professional contract for the Indianapolis Clowns.

== Early life ==
Scott was born in Dade City, Florida, but moved to Mobile, Alabama, as a young man, where he played baseball for a local, semi-professional African-American team, the Mobile Black Shippers. He worked in a paper company and barnstormed the area with his baseball team. When his playing days ended, he started scouting. The baseball color line had been broken in minor league baseball in 1946, and in MLB the following year, by Jackie Robinson. But the 16 Major League teams were slow to integrate and the Negro Leagues were still operating when Scott's scouting career began.

== Hank Aaron signing ==
According to Ed Scott Jr., his father discovered the teenaged Aaron playing in a Mobile softball game. "If that boy can hit a softball that far, how far can he hit a baseball?" his son quoted Ed Sr. as saying. With the help of field manager Bunny Downs, He was able to sign Aaron for the Indianapolis Clowns, and by 1952, the 18-year-old player was offered a contract by the Boston Braves. Aaron would go on to play 23 big-league seasons, and shatter (in 1974) Babe Ruth's all-time record with 755 home runs over his career. (Aaron currently stands second, all time, to Barry Bonds.)

== Red Sox signings ==
Scott spent four decades with the Red Sox as a scout, beginning in the early 1960s. Among the players he signed for Boston were George Scott (no relation), Oil Can Boyd and Amos Otis, who was drafted out of the Boston system as a minor-league prospect by the New York Mets. Ed Scott was still listed as a scouting consultant by the Red Sox in 2001. His son Alex also was a Boston area scout based in Mobile during the 1990s.

== Personal life and death ==
Also an accomplished golfer, Scott was inducted into the Mobile Sports Hall of Fame in 2003. He died in Mobile at age 92 on January 11, 2010.
