= Pittsfield Electrics (Eastern Association) =

The Pittsfield Electrics were an American minor league baseball club located in Pittsfield, Massachusetts. They joined the Eastern Association, a now defunct minor professional baseball league, in 1913, and finished in 7th place that first year with a record of 62 wins and 73 losses. Pittsfield's W.I. Smith led the EA with 175 strikeouts. After the 1914 season, the team finished in 6th place with a record of 60 wins and 63 losses, the Eastern Association folded. Robert Troy led the EA with 212 strikeouts.

The Electrics played their home games at Wahconah Park.

== Future Major League Electrics ==
- Lew Wendell (1913)
- Pat Parker (1914)
- Otto Rettig (1914)

== Electrics with previous Major League experience ==
- Art Nichols (1913)
- Jock Somerlott (1913-1914)
- Polly Wolfe (1913-1914)
- Bun Troy (1914)
- Frank Nicholson (1914)
