= Berkshire Black Bears =

- 2002–2003; Pittsfield, Massachusetts
Team logo
Cap insignia

Minor league affiliations
- Class: Independent (2002–2003)
- League: Northeast League (2003); Northern League (2002)

Minor league titles
- League titles: None

Team data
- Colors: Blue, black
- Ballpark: Wahconah Park (2002–2003)
- Owner/ Operator: Jonathan Fleisig
- President: Mike Kardamis
- Manager: George Scott, Darren Bush
- Media: WBRK-FM

The Berkshire Black Bears were a minor league baseball team in the independent Northeast League. They played at Wahconah Park in Pittsfield, Massachusetts starting in 2002. After the 2003 season, they relocated to New Haven, Connecticut and renamed themselves the New Haven County Cutters.

== History ==
In the First Half of the season for the North Division, they finished last with a record of 14-31, tying the Allentown Ambassadors for the worst record in the first half. In the Second Half, they finished last in their division again with a 10-34, which was also the worst record across the league for the second half. In 43 home games, they drew 56,295 fans for an average of 1,309 per game, both numbers ranking near the bottom of the league.

After this poor performance, manager George Scott was to be replaced, and the team later announced his replacement for 2003 was Darren Bush. Following this, they also hired Jim Dedrick as their pitching coach. After these additions, they went 41-51 during the season, marking an improvement from their previous season, but in comparison to the rest of the league they performed second worst. As well, their attendance went down to just 43,846 fans for an average of 946 per day, which similarly measured poorly compared to the rest of the league.

== Demise ==
At the end of the 2003 season, the Berkshire Black Bears did not renew their lease. Jonathan Fleisig, still pursuing a career in independent baseball, moved the team to New Haven, Connecticut where it became the New Haven County Cutters.
