= Pittsfield Colonials =

Can-Am League baseball team based in Massachusetts

- 2010–2011; Pittsfield, Massachusetts
Team logo
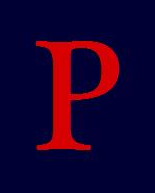
Cap insignia

Minor league affiliations
- Class: Independent (2010–11)
- League: Can-Am League (2010–11)

Minor league titles
- League titles: none

Team data
- Name: Pittsfield Colonials (2010–11)
- Colors: Navy, red, white
- Ballpark: Wahconah Park (2010–11)
- Owner(s)/ Operator(s): Buddy Lewis and Jerry O'Connor
- General manager: Greg Martin
- Manager: Jamie Keefe
- Media: Berkshire Eagle, Pittsfield Gazette

The Pittsfield Colonials were a baseball team in the independent Canadian-American Association of Professional Baseball, based in Pittsfield, Massachusetts. The team was previously known as the American Defenders of New Hampshire (often simply referred to as the "Defenders"), and prior to that was known as the Nashua Pride.

The Colonials (in their previous incarnations as the Defenders and the Pride), played in Nashua, New Hampshire from their debut as part of the Atlantic League of Professional Baseball in 1998 until the end of the 2009 season, and called Holman Stadium in Nashua home, until the summer of 2009. In August of that year, the city of Nashua evicted the Defenders from their home and parked a tractor on home plate, refusing to move it or let the team back into the stadium until $45,000 in back rent and property taxes were repaid to the city.

The team has played at Wahconah Park, the former home of the Berkshire Black Bears of the Northeast League (the Can-Am League's predecessor), since 2010; the Colonials are the first Can-Am or Northeast League team to call the park home since the Black Bears moved to New Haven, Connecticut in 2004. The team's name was chosen in March 2010 after a contest run by the Berkshire Eagle, one of the two papers that have covered the Colonials since the 2010 season.

The move to Pittsfield forced the displacement of Wahconah's previous tenants, the NECBL's Pittsfield American Defenders, which were owned by the same ownership group that bought the Pride in 2008. In the case of the Pride and the former Pittsfield Dukes, the ownership group changed the name of the team. The American Defenders name was an homage to the U.S. Armed Forces. One of the prominent members of the team's prior ownership group, Terry Allvord, is the founder of armed forces baseball in the modern era and a retired U.S. Naval Lieutenant Commander who served 23 years and logged over 5,000 flight hours as a rescue swimmer and helicopter pilot. The former Pittsfield franchise in the NECBL is now based in Mystic, Connecticut, where it is known as the Mystic Schooners.

== History ==
The Nashua Pride was one of the founding members of the Atlantic League in 1998. In the 2000 season, the team swept the Somerset Patriots in three games to win the Atlantic League Championship Series. However, the Patriots answered that loss by defeating the Pride in the 2003 and 2005 championships. The Pride had one of the lowest average attendances in the league was the farthest team from the core of the league. In 2006, the team moved to the Canadian American Association (Can-Am League). As Nashua is closer in proximity to the teams of the Can-Am League than those of the Atlantic, the Pride was relieved of the expensive travel to away games.

The Nashua Pride won the 2007 Can-Am League championship.

=== Sale of the Pride ===
Following the 2008 season, the former owner of the team, John Stabile, sold the team to the American Defenders of New Hampshire, LLC. With the sale of the team, the name was changed from the Nashua Pride to the American Defenders of New Hampshire, placing less of an emphasis on the Nashua market. The change of the geographical portion of the name is meant to emphasize the globalism of the United States military.

American Defenders of New Hampshire ownership consisted of Nokona executives Buddy Lewis and Jerry O'Connor, former Boston Red Sox general manager Dan Duquette, and Terry Allvord, founder of the U.S. Military All-Stars "Red, White and Blue Tour".

The new management promoted Brian Daubach, who became the hitting coach of the Nashua Pride during the second half of 2008, to manage the team.

Allvord, O'Connor, and Duquette are no longer owners of the team, as Buddy Lewis led new investors who purchased the team in early 2010.

=== Folding ===
It was announced on October 4, 2011, that the Can-Am League owners voted to rescind the team's membership in the league. Buddy Lewis was again searching for investors, but was unable to convince anyone to buy in.
