= New Haven County Cutters =

Minor-league professional baseball team in New Haven, Connecticut

Logo
Cap insignia

Information
- League: Can-Am League
- Location: New Haven, Connecticut
- Ballpark: Yale Field (2004–2007)
- Founded: 2004
- Disbanded: 2007
- League championships: None
- Former name: New Haven County Cutters (2004–07); Berkshire Black Bears (2002–03); Massachusetts Mad Dogs (1996–99)
- Former ballparks: Wahconah Park (2002–2003); Fraser Field (1996–1999)
- Colors: Powder blue, yellow, black
- Ownership: New Haven County Cutters Ownership Group
- General manager: Marie Heikkinen Webb
- Manager: Mike Church
- Media: New Haven Register
- Website: www.cuttersbaseball.com

The New Haven County Cutters were an independent baseball team based in New Haven, Connecticut. From 2004 through 2007, the Cutters played in the Canadian American Association of Professional Baseball (the "Can-Am League", formerly known as the Northeast League in 2004), an independent league that is not affiliated with Major League Baseball nor with the Minor League Baseball organization.

== Franchise history ==
=== Massachusetts Mad Dogs ===
Massachusetts Mad Dogs logo

Originally based in Lynn, Massachusetts, the Massachusetts Mad Dogs were named during an event that included students from Lynn and nearby Nahant, Massachusetts. The Mad Dogs were members of three different independent baseball leagues. They began to play in 1996 as an expansion team in the North Atlantic League with former major league star George Scott as manager, who managed the team for all four years that the Mad Dogs played in the region. They dominated the NAL, going 56-21 and winning the pennant by 13 1/2 games, but were defeated in two games in the best-of-3 playoffs by the Catskill Cougars. The Mad Dogs drew the most fans in the league with 52,384.

When the NAL folded after the 1996 season, the Mad Dogs jumped to the Northeast League and went 45–37, tying for the second half northern lead (23-17) with the Albany-Colonie Diamond Dogs. Massachusetts lost to Albany in the playoffs 2 games to 1. The first year in the Northeast League drew 72,681 fans, second to Albany's 72,985.

The Mad Dogs fell to 39–45 in 1998 and were next to last in attendance, drawing only 47,123 fans that season. In 1999, the Northeast League merged into the Northern League to form the Northern League East Division. The club was 41–45 in a tight division. They finished one game out of first place in the first half of the season, and tied for last place in the second half but were just four games back. Attendance fell to last in the Northern League's Eastern Division with 38,528. Following the 1999 season, the team suspended operations, citing major issues with the team's home in Lynn, Fraser Field.

=== Berkshire Black Bears ===
After a three-year hiatus, the franchise was resurrected, this time in Pittsfield, Massachusetts as the Berkshire Black Bears, playing at Wahconah Park. Despite the change of location, the losing continued and the team drew minimal support from the area. Following the 2003 season, the team moved again, this time to New Haven, Connecticut. Owner Jonathan Fleisig attributed the move to criticism of the team from Pittsfield civic leaders.

=== New Haven County Cutters ===
During their four seasons in New Haven, the Cutters had varying degrees of success. Their first season saw them leading the Northeast League South Division for most of the first half of the season, but the team severely faltered down the stretch and ended up losing the division to the eventual league champion New Jersey Jackals in a one-game playoff at Yale Field. The bad streak continued, and the Cutters fell to last place in the division in the second half and cost first-year manager Jarvis Brown, a former Minnesota Twins prospect, his job.

In 2005, led by first-year manager Mike Church, the Cutters' fortunes started out badly in the first half with an 18–28 record. However, in the second half, they had a complete reversal of fortune and won their first half-season division championship, with a 28–18 record, and qualified for the Can-Am League playoffs. However, the Cutters' luck ran out in the first round of the playoffs, as they were eliminated 3 games to 1 by the eventual league champion Worcester Tornadoes.

In 2006, the Cutters kept pace with the league-leading North Shore Spirit with the second-best overall record in the league. The Cutters once again were defeated in the first round of the Can-Am League playoffs by the Brockton Rox three games to one.

On October 30, 2007, Cutters' President David Boyle, Chairman Jonathan Fleisig, and Vice Chairman Rick Handelman announced that the team would "not be playing baseball at Yale Field in 2008." The Cutters were joined by the North Shore Spirit in no longer being part of the Can-Am League in the 2008 season.

On November 9–10, 2007, the Cutters held a sale at Yale Field to sell off any remaining Cutters merchandise to those interested in getting their piece of New Haven baseball history.

== Notable alumni ==
- Gavin Fingleson, Olympic baseball silver medal winner

== See also ==
- Professional baseball in Connecticut
