= Pittsfield Mets =

- 1989–2001; Pittsfield, Massachusetts

Minor league affiliations
- Class: Short-Season A (1989–2001)
- League: New York–Penn League (1989–2001)

Major league affiliations
- Team: Houston Astros (2001); New York Mets (1989–2000)

Minor league titles
- League titles: 1997

Team data
- Name: Pittsfield Astros (2001); Pittsfield Mets (1989–2000)
- Mascot: Boomer the Walrus (1994-2001)
- Ballpark: Wahconah Park (1989–2001)

The Pittsfield Mets were a minor league baseball based in Pittsfield, Massachusetts and played their home games Wahconah Park. The team previously played as the Little Falls Mets from Little Falls, New York before an investment group organized by Michael T. Casey relocated the team to Pittsfield. The team played in the New York–Penn League, and were affiliated with the New York Mets from 1989 to 2000. In 2001 the team became the Pittsfield Astros when they began their affiliation with the Houston Astros. After the 2001 season, the club was relocated to Troy, New York and became the Tri-City ValleyCats.

Mike Tannenbaum, former general manager for the New York Jets, was an intern for the Mets during the 1991 season.

== Notable alumni ==
The following is a list of Major League Baseball alumni that played for the Pittsfield Mets and Pittsfield Astros, with the year that they played with the club.

- Alberto Castillo (1989–1990)
- Denny Harriger (1989)
- Pat Howell (1989)
- John Johnstone (1989)
- Tito Navarro (1989)
- Curtis Pride (1989)
- Dave Telgheder (1989)
- Joe Vitko (1989)
- Alan Zinter (1989)
- Jeromy Burnitz (1990)
- Mike Thomas (1990)
- Pete Walker (1990)
- Juan Castillo (1990)
- Micah Franklin (1991)
- Guillermo Garcia (1991–1992)
- Ricky Otero (1991)
- Quilvio Veras (1991)
- Héctor Carrasco (1991)
- Edgardo Alfonzo (1992)
- Brian Daubach (1992)
- Bill Pulsipher (1992)
- Benny Agbayani (1993)
- Preston Wilson (1993)
- Jason Isringhausen (1993)
- Eric Ludwick (1993)
- Allen McDill (1993)
- Jeff Tam (1993)
- Mike Welch (1993)
- Jarrod Patterson (1994)
- Jay Payton (1994)
- Scott Sauerbeck (1994)
- Vance Wilson (1994)
- Terrence Long (1995)
- Dan Murray (1995)
- Ramón Tatís (1995)
- Brandon Villafuerte (1996)
- A. J. Burnett (1997)
- Eric Cammack (1997)
- Leo Estrella (1997)
- Jason Phillips (1997)
- Jason Roach (1997, 2000)
- Earl Snyder (1998)
- Ty Wigginton (1998)
- Chris Başak (2000)
- Jaime Cerda (2000)
- Jeff Duncan (2000)
- Philip Barzilla (2001)
- Brooks Conrad (2001)
- Charlton Jimerson (2001)
- Todd Self (2001)
