= Stu Locklin =

American baseball player (1928–2016)

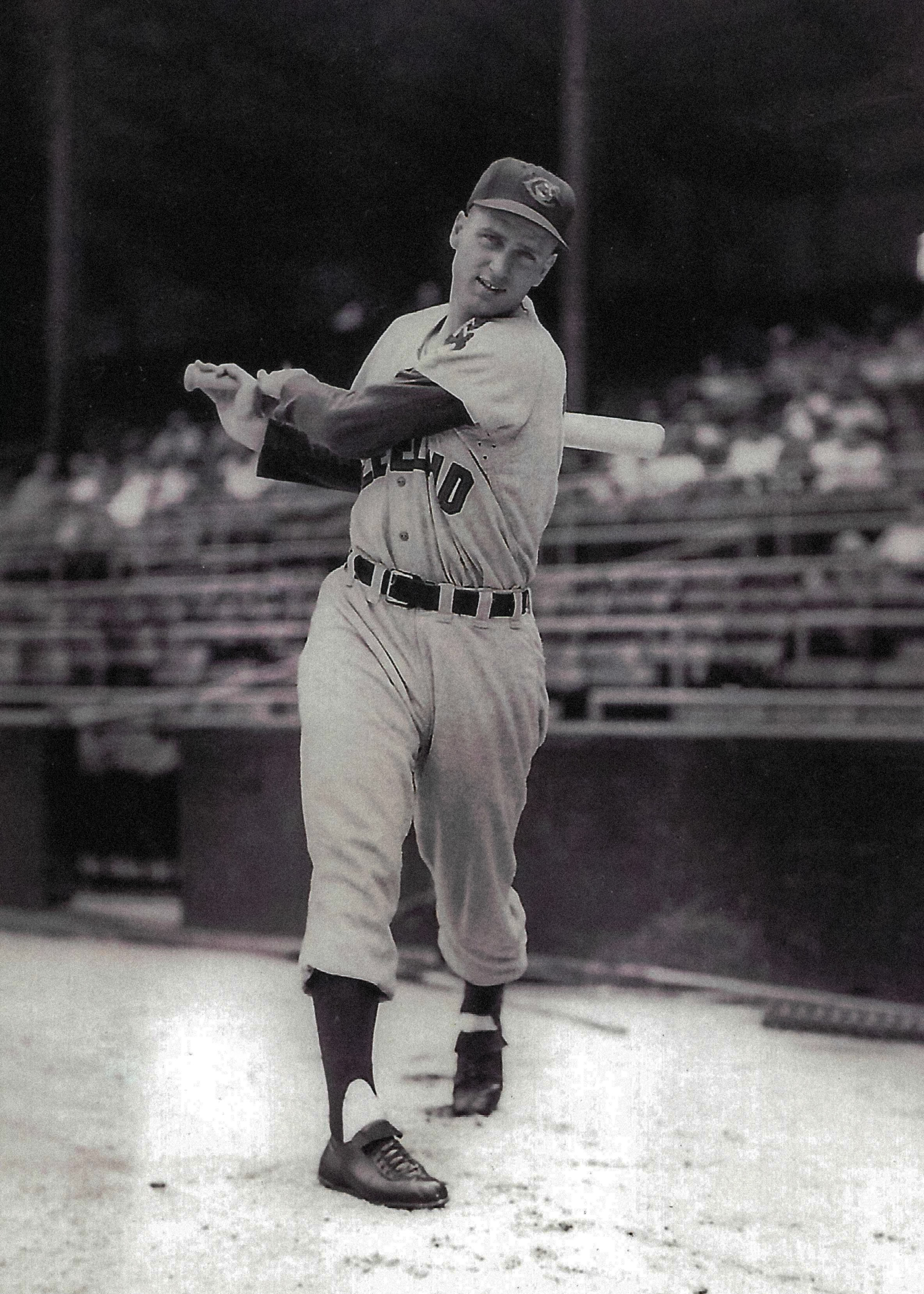
- Outfielder
- Born: July 22, 1928; Appleton, Wisconsin, US
- Died: December 4, 2016 (aged 88); Albuquerque, New Mexico, US
- Batted: Left Threw: Left

MLB debut
- June 23, 1955, for the Cleveland Indians

Last MLB appearance
- May 30, 1956, for the Cleveland Indians

MLB statistics
- Batting average: .167
- Hits: 4
- Runs: 4
- Stats at Baseball Reference

Teams
- Cleveland Indians (1955–1956)

Stuart Carlton Locklin (July 22, 1928 – December 4, 2016) was an American Major League Baseball outfielder who played 25 games for the Cleveland Indians during parts of the 1955 and 1956 seasons. On the baseball diamond, Locklin's nickname was "Lefty."

== Early years ==
Locklin was an all-state performer in three sports, football, basketball, and track, at Appleton High in Appleton, Wisconsin (now Appleton West High School). Locklin was a member of the National Honor Society in high school. Stu was the oldest brother, and his other two siblings Mory and Ron Locklin were also exceptional amateur athletes at Appleton High. Appleton West honored Locklin in a ceremony in 2011.

He enrolled in the University of Wisconsin on an athletic scholarship in the 1946–1947 academic year. As a freshman, he started at right end on the football team and as the center fielder on the baseball team. He led the baseball team in average (.352), hits, and runs as a freshman. Because of his potential as a baseball player, he gave up football and its high risk of injury after his freshman year. As a sophomore, he played on the varsity basketball team. He earned three letters competing as a Badger in his first two years of college, before signing a professional baseball contract with the Cleveland Indians organization in 1949. Although his amateur athletic career was over upon signing the contract, he continued to attend the University of Wisconsin and earned a bachelor's degree in business and a master's degree in education.

== Baseball career ==
Stu began his professional career in 1949 and successfully began moving through the Indians' minor league affiliates at Dayton, Oklahoma City, and San Diego. In 1951, Locklin appeared to be about to enter his prime as a ballplayer and the Indians' purchased his contract from their triple AAA affiliate in San Diego, priming him for a big league debut in 1952. However, against the backdrop of the Korean War, he enlisted in the Air Force in 1952. He was stationed at Lockborne Air Force Base in Columbus, Ohio. Although his professional baseball career was on hold while he served in the Air Force from 1952 through 1954, Locklin was a member of the Lockborne AFB baseball team, coached by future New York Yankees owner George Steinbrenner.

In 1955, Locklin made the Indians roster, primarily as a pinch hitter and runner. Locklin continued with the Indians into the 1956 season, when he suffered a leg injury and was optioned to the Indians' affiliate club. He returned to the Indians for spring training in 1957, but he did not make the roster. Locklin's professional baseball career continued for five more years in Indianapolis, Miami, Minneapolis, and San Diego. While playing for the Minneapolis Millers, Locklin participated in the 1959 Junior World Series against a team from Cuba. While playing most of the series in Cuba due to poor weather in Minneapolis, Fidel Castro attended each game. Before the deciding seventh game, Castro approached Locklin, pointed at his six-gun on his hip and stated "tonight, we win." Locklin was traded to the Boston Red Sox organization late in his career. He retired from professional baseball after the 1960 season.

== Later life ==
After baseball, Locklin became a school teacher, coach, and guidance counselor in his hometown of Appleton. He was a Catholic who volunteered extensively for various church organizations and charities. Late in his life, he moved to Albuquerque, New Mexico. He died on December 4, 2016, at the age of 88.
