= Hal Naragon =

American baseball player (1928–2019)

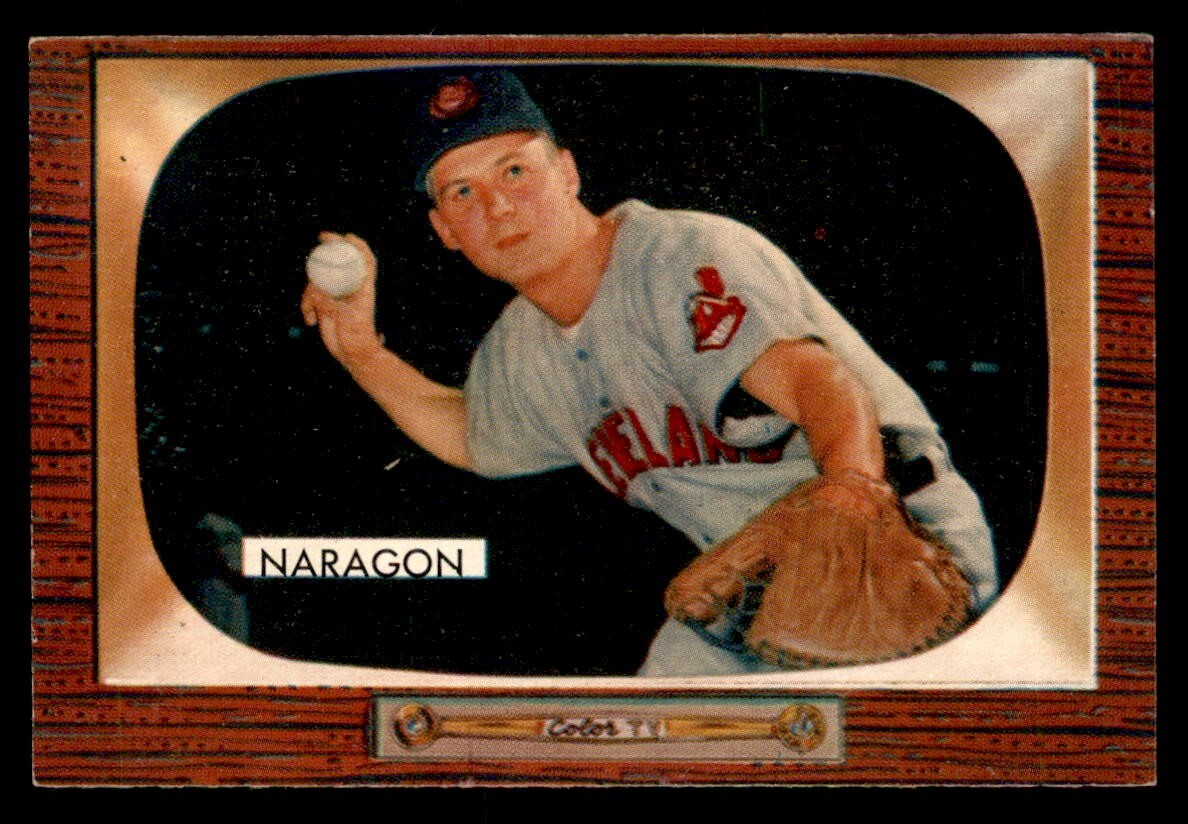
- Catcher
- Born: October 1, 1928; Zanesville, Ohio, U.S.
- Died: August 31, 2019 (aged 90); Barberton, Ohio, U.S.
- Batted: Left Threw: Right

MLB debut
- September 23, 1951, for the Cleveland Indians

Last MLB appearance
- August 5, 1962, for the Minnesota Twins

MLB statistics
- Batting average: .266
- Home runs: 6
- Runs batted in: 87
- Stats at Baseball Reference

Teams
- As player: Cleveland Indians (1951, 1954–1959); Washington Senators/Minnesota Twins (1959–1962); As coach: Minnesota Twins (1963–1966); Detroit Tigers (1967–1969)

Career highlights and awards
- World Series champion (1968)

Harold Richard Naragon (October 1, 1928 – August 31, 2019) was an American catcher in Major League Baseball who played for the Cleveland Indians (1951; 1954–59) and Washington Senators/Minnesota Twins (1959–62). He batted left-handed and threw right-handed.

== Early life and career ==
Naragon was born in Zanesville, Ohio, and graduated from Barberton High School in Ohio. After signing with the Cleveland Indians organization, he began his career in 1947 with the Pittsfield Electrics. He split the 1948 season between the Watertown Athletics and Harrisburg Senators. He spent 1950 with the Oklahoma City Indians, and 1951 with the San Diego Padres.

== Professional career ==
=== As player ===
Naragon was promoted to the Indians late in the 1951 season and played in three games. After the season, he entered the United States Marine Corps and was stationed at Quantico during the Korean War. According to his honorable discharge, which lists his main civilian occupation as "Baseball Player," he was awarded the National Defense Service Medal, he attained the rank of Sergeant, and he was recommended for reenlistment. He returned to the Indians in 1954, where he remained through the beginning of the 1959 season. His best season with the Indians was 1955, when he played in 57 games and had a .323 batting average. He also caught one inning for the Indians in Game 3 of the 1954 World Series against the New York Giants.

On May 25, 1959, Naragon was traded to the Washington Senators with Hal Woodeshick for Ed Fitz Gerald. He spent the remaining four years of his career with the Senators, who became the Twins in 1961. He spent much of his career backing up starting catchers Jim Hegan in Cleveland and Earl Battey in Washington/Minnesota. He was released from the Twins after the 1962 season, ending his playing career. In his 10-season MLB career, Naragon was a .266 hitter, with 262 hits, 27 doubles, 11 triples, six home runs and 87 RBI in 424 games played. He recorded a .991 fielding percentage.

=== As coach ===
Following his playing career, Naragon was the bullpen coach for the Twins (1963–1966) and Detroit Tigers (1967–1969). He was closely associated with pitching coach Johnny Sain, and was a member of the 1965 American League champion Twins and the 1968 world champion Tigers.

When Twins' manager Sam Mele was suspended for five days (and six games) for a physical confrontation with an umpire on July 19, 1965, he named Naragon his emergency replacement, bypassing his well-known third-base coach, Billy Martin. Naragon directed the Twins to a 5–1 record before Mele was reinstated on July 24.

== Later life ==
After his baseball career ended, he operated a sporting goods store in Barberton, where he lived with his wife and daughter. Naragon died August 31, 2019, at the age of 90. His tombstone bears the eagle-globe-and-anchor insignia of the United States Marine Corps.

Preceded by Mike Roarke	Detroit Tigers bullpen coach 1967–1969	Succeeded by Len Okrie
