= Jorge Comellas =

Cuban baseball player (1916–2001)

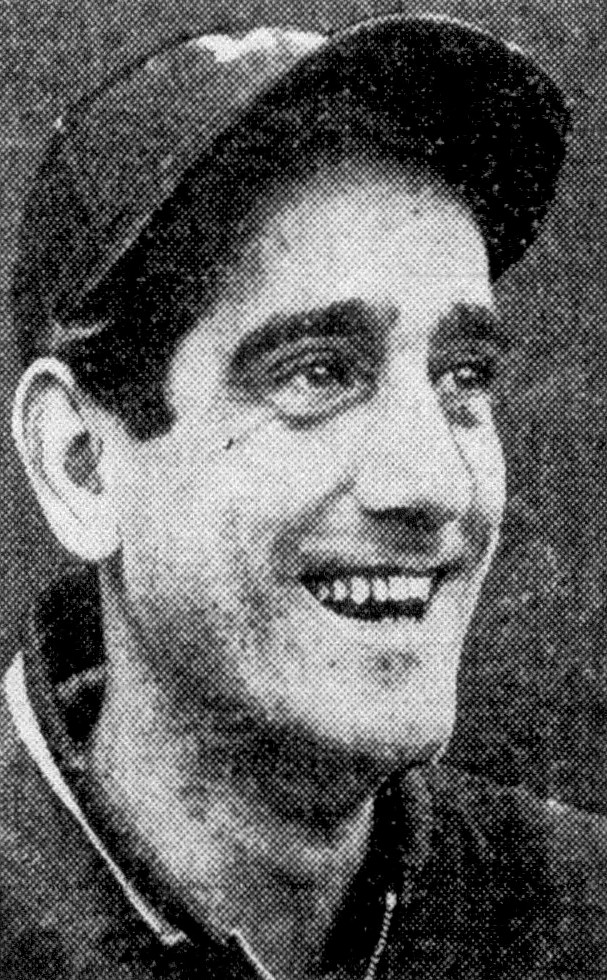
- Comellas, circa 1945
- Pitcher
- Born: December 7, 1916; Havana, Cuba
- Died: September 13, 2001 (aged 84); Miami, Florida, U.S.
- Batted: Right Threw: Right

MLB debut
- April 19, 1945, for the Chicago Cubs

Last MLB appearance
- May 29, 1945, for the Chicago Cubs

MLB statistics
- Win–loss record: 0–2
- Earned run average: 4.50
- Strikeouts: 6
- Stats at Baseball Reference

Teams
- Chicago Cubs (1945)

Jorge Comellas (December 7, 1916 – September 13, 2001) was a Cuban pitcher in Major League Baseball who played for the Chicago Cubs during the 1945 season. Listed at 6' 0", 190 lb., he batted and threw right handed.
