= Stan Pawloski =

American baseball player (born 1931)

- Second baseman
- Born: September 6, 1931 (age 94); Wanamie, Pennsylvania, U.S.
- Batted: Right Threw: Right

MLB debut
- September 24, 1955, for the Cleveland Indians

Last MLB appearance
- September 25, 1955, for the Cleveland Indians

MLB statistics
- Batting average: .125
- Games played: 2
- Hits: 1
- Stats at Baseball Reference

Teams
- Cleveland Indians (1955)

Stanley Walter Pawloski (born September 6, 1931) is an American former Major League Baseball second baseman who played in two games for the Cleveland Indians during the 1955 season. Pawloski threw and batted right-handed, stood 6 feet 1 inch (1.85 m) tall and weighed 175 pounds (79 kg).

He was in his seventh season in the Cleveland farm system and had batted .267 with 14 home runs and 80 runs batted in for the Triple-A Indianapolis Indians when he was recalled in September 1955. He started back-to-back games as a second baseman on September 24–25 during a Cleveland road trip to Detroit's Briggs Stadium. In his debut game, he was held hitless by Ned Garver and Paul Foytack, but in his second contest, he collected his only MLB hit in his eighth and final at bat, a single off Tiger southpaw Bob Miller in the top of the ninth inning. He played errorless ball in the field, handling 11 chances.

Pawloski played minor league baseball from 1949–1952 and 1954–1958, all in the Indians' system, and hit .267 lifetime.
