= Lew Wendell =

American baseball player (1892-1953)

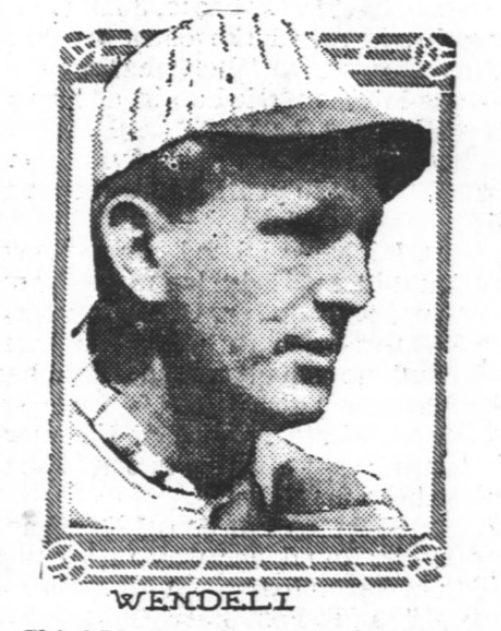
- Catcher
- Born: March 22, 1892; New York City, New York, U.S.
- Died: July 11, 1953 (aged 61); Brooklyn, New York, U.S.
- Batted: Right Threw: Right

MLB debut
- June 10, 1915, for the New York Giants

Last MLB appearance
- May 22, 1926, for the Philadelphia Phillies

MLB statistics
- Batting average: .180
- Home runs: 0
- Runs batted in: 10
- Stats at Baseball Reference

Teams
- New York Giants (1915–1916); Philadelphia Phillies (1924–1926)

Lewis Charles Wendell (March 22, 1892 – July 11, 1953) was an American baseball player and team manager. Wendell was born March 22, 1892, in New York City. He played as a catcher in Major League Baseball, with his first game in 1915.

Wendell's professional career began in 1912 with the minor league Albany Senators. After three seasons in the minors, Wendell made his MLB debut with the New York Giants in 1915. After playing in two games with the Giants in 1916, Wendell returned to the minors with the Louisville Colonels.

Wendell spent the next several seasons moving from team to team in the minors. In 1919 he played with the Pittsfield Hillies in Pittsfield, Massachusetts. In 1921, he was the first of two managers for the Greenville Spinners in the Class-B South Atlantic League, where he was also the team's starting catcher.

Wendell finally made his way back to the majors in 1924 with the Philadelphia Phillies. Wendell played parts of three seasons with the Phillies, and his last MLB game was in 1926. He returned to the minor leagues one more time, playing the rest of 1926 and all of 1927 with the Portland Beavers.

He died July 11, 1953, in Brooklyn, New York City. He is interred at Woodlawn Cemetery in the Bronx, New York City.
