= Art Nichols =

American baseball player (1871–1945)

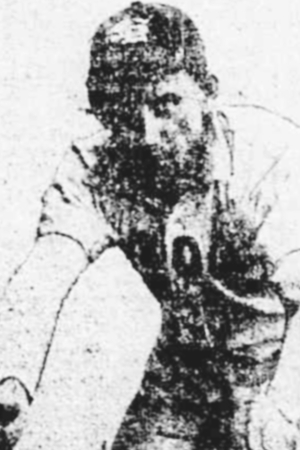
- Catcher / First baseman / Outfielder
- Born: July 14, 1871; Manchester, New Hampshire, U.S.
- Died: August 9, 1945 (aged 74); Willimantic, Connecticut, U.S.
- Batted: Right Threw: Right

MLB debut
- September 16, 1898, for the Chicago Orphans

Last MLB appearance
- June 10, 1903, for the St. Louis Cardinals

MLB statistics
- Batting average: .245
- Home runs: 3
- Runs batted in: 90
- Stats at Baseball Reference

Teams
- Chicago Orphans (1898–1900); St. Louis Cardinals (1901–1903)

Arthur Francis Nichols (born Arthur Francis Meikle; July 14, 1871 – August 9, 1945) was an American Major League Baseball player who played catcher, first baseman, and outfielder who played for the Chicago Orphans from 1898 to 1900 and the St. Louis Cardinals from 1901 to 1903.

== Sources ==
- Career statistics from Baseball Reference · Baseball Reference (Minors) · Retrosheet · Baseball Almanac
