= George Scott (first baseman) =

American baseball player (1944–2013)

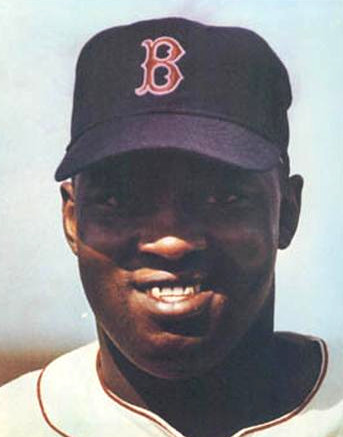
- First baseman
- Born: March 23, 1944; Greenville, Mississippi, U.S.
- Died: July 28, 2013 (aged 69); Greenville, Mississippi, U.S.
- Batted: Right Threw: Right

MLB debut
- April 12, 1966, for the Boston Red Sox

Last MLB appearance
- September 27, 1979, for the New York Yankees

MLB statistics
- Batting average: .268
- Home runs: 271
- Runs batted in: 1,051
- Stats at Baseball Reference

Teams
- Boston Red Sox (1966–1971); Milwaukee Brewers (1972–1976); Boston Red Sox (1977–1979); Kansas City Royals (1979); New York Yankees (1979)

Career highlights and awards
- 3× All-Star (1966, 1975, 1977); 8× Gold Glove Award (1967, 1968, 1971–1976); AL home run leader (1975); AL RBI leader (1975); Boston Red Sox Hall of Fame; Milwaukee Brewers Wall of Honor

George Charles Scott Jr. (March 23, 1944 – July 28, 2013), nicknamed "Boomer", was an American professional baseball player, coach and manager. He played in Major League Baseball as a first baseman from 1966 to 1979, most prominently for the Boston Red Sox where he was a member of the 1967 American League pennant winning team and, with the Milwaukee Brewers where he was the 1975 American League home run and RBI champion.

A three-time All-Star player, Scott was one of the most accomplished defensive first basemen of his era, winning eight Gold Glove Awards between 1967 and 1976. During his major league career, he also played for the Kansas City Royals and the New York Yankees.

After his Major League career, Scott became a player-manager in the Mexican League and went on to become full-time manager in the Independent baseball league from the 1980s until 2002. He was inducted into the Boston Red Sox Hall of Fame in 2006 and the Mississippi Sports Hall of Fame the following year. In 2014, he was inducted into the Milwaukee Brewers Wall of Honor.

== Early years ==
Scott was born March 23, 1944, in Greenville, Mississippi, as the youngest of three children. His father, a cotton farm laborer, died when George Jr. was two years old, and young George was picking cotton by age nine. "That's all we knew", he said. "The reason you did that, all of that money was turned over to your parents to make ends meet. Nothing can be worse than getting up at four in the morning waiting for a truck to pick you up to go pick and chop cotton from six or seven in the morning until five or six in the afternoon."

Scott played Little League baseball in his spare time but was temporarily ejected from the team for being "too good", having hit two or three home runs per game in one six-game stretch. At Coleman High School in Greenville he excelled in baseball, football and basketball, quarterbacking the football team and leading his football and basketball teams to state championships. Scott chose baseball as a career "to make my living. I got tired of watching my mom struggle [with three jobs]. I didn't have the mind that I could go to college and see my mother struggle for another four or five years."

Major league scout Ed Scott (no relation to George), who had signed Hank Aaron to his first major league contract, discovered George Scott and signed him as an amateur free agent straight out of high school on May 28, 1962, for $8,000. Eventually promoted to the Boston Red Sox' new Pittsfield Red Sox farm team of the Double-A Eastern League in 1965, Scott became the Eastern League triple crown winner that year, leading the league in home runs, RBIs, and batting average.

== Career ==
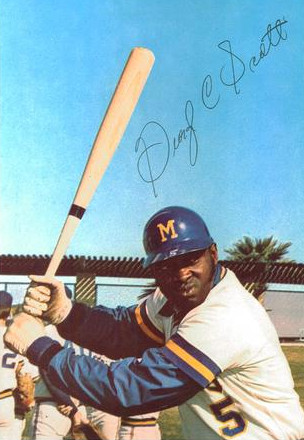
Scott with the Milwaukee Brewers in 1973

He became a Red Sox major-league rookie in 1966 as a third baseman, was switched to first base one week into the season, and played all 162 games that season, the last Red Sox rookie to do so. On Opening Day (April 12), he batted fifth against the Baltimore Orioles and went 1-for-4 with an RBI (drawing a walk with the bases loaded) while gaining his first hit with a triple off Moe Drabowsky. He hit his first home run of the year one week later off Joe Sparma of the Detroit Tigers. He batted .245 with 147 hits, 27 home runs, and 90 RBIs (finishing in the top ten in RBIs, home runs, and total bases) while garnering an All-Star selection and finished third in the voting for Rookie of the Year. His good start was soon hampered by a slump in which he could not adjust quickly enough to deal with change-ups and curve ball pitches. Manager Billy Herman stated he would bench Scott on July 19, but a rainout occurred on that day before a doubleheader was played, each of which featured Scott starting. At any rate, Scott led all of baseball in strikeouts (152) and times grounded into a double play (25). He spent 158 games at first base (with four at third base), and he led the league in putouts, games, and double plays.

Scott did fine during his sophomore season, which turned out to be the longest season of his career, as the "Impossible Dream" Red Sox won the American League pennant, led by rookie manager Dick Williams. He also benched Scott for a few games, concerned about him being overweight (desiring a weight of 215 pounds). Scott played 159 games while batting .303 (he would bat .300 just one other time in his career). He walked over 60 times again, but he reduced his strikeout total to 119 while hitting 19 home runs and having 171 hits. He received votes for the MVP Award (finishing 10th with 12% of the vote) while being awarded the Gold Glove (he led the league in putouts, games, assists, errors, and double plays). His team went to the 1967 World Series and played the St. Louis Cardinals in a classic seven game series. Scott hit .231 (6-for-26) while having three walks and six strikeouts and scoring three times, and committed the final out of the Series, striking out against Bob Gibson as the Cardinals won Game 7.

Scott was a three-time All-Star in the American League in 1966, 1975 and 1977, starting the 1966 Mid-Summer Classic and homering in 1977. Scott hit over 20 home runs six times in his career, tying Reggie Jackson for the American League lead in 1975 with a career-high 36 and pacing the league in runs batted in (RBIs) that same season with 109. Known for his glovework at first base, Scott was awarded the Gold Glove Award for fielding excellence in the American League during eight seasons (1967–68 and 1971–1976).

In a 14-season career, Scott posted a .268 batting average with 271 home runs (which he called "taters") and 1,051 RBIs in 2,034 games. His nickname was Boomer and he called his glove "Black Beauty". Scott was well-known for having a good sense of humor, and wore a necklace which he once identified to a reporter as being composed of "second baseman's teeth". To complement his unique attire, he also was known for wearing a batting helmet while fielding at first base due to an experience he had with a fan throwing hard objects at him once during a road game.

He was traded three times during his career. The first was a ten-player deal sending him, Jim Lonborg, Ken Brett, Billy Conigliaro, Joe Lahoud and Don Pavletich from the Red Sox to the Milwaukee Brewers for Tommy Harper, Marty Pattin, Lew Krausse and minor-league outfielder Pat Skrable on October 10, 1971. While on the Brewers, Scott won five-consecutive Gold Glove awards. In 1975, he was named an all-star and led major league baseball with 36 home-runs and 109 RBI. On December 6, 1976, Scott was traded back to the Red Sox with Bernie Carbo for Boston’s Cecil Cooper.

Scott saw his second tenure with the Red Sox end when he was traded to the Kansas City Royals for Tom Poquette on June 13, 1979. On August 17, he was released by the team, and he joined the New York Yankees nine days later. He played 105 games that year while batting .254 with 88 hits, 31 walks, and 61 strikeouts (spent mostly on first base, although he did appear in 17 games as a designated hitter). He finished in the top five in two categories: double play grounded into (24, 2nd) and errors (10, 4th).

After the season, Scott moved to the Mexican League, playing for the Leones de Yucatán in 1980, and the Tigres del México in 1981.

== Legacy ==
Scott spent nine of his 14 years with the Red Sox and is Boston's all-time leader at first base with 988 games played, including 944 starts. Scott hit 154 of his 271 career home runs with the Red Sox and is a member of the Boston Red Sox Hall of Fame, having been inducted in 2006. George Scott's 1968 season was noted by ESPN as one of the worst offensive performances ever, especially for a first baseman (he batted a career low .171/.236/.237 in batting average, OBP, and SLG in 124 games in the only season he hit no triples).

Tommy John praised Scott's hitting ability in a 1984 interview. "When Scott first came into the league, no one knew how to pitch to him, and they didn't find out for three years."

== Later life and death ==
After he had left the playing field, he served as a manager for various teams, ranging from the Mexican League to independent league baseball. He coached for Roxbury Community College (1991-1995), the Saskatoon Riot in 1995 (going 26-45), the Massachusetts Mad Dogs (1996-1999, where he went 181-148), the Rio Grande Valley WhiteWings (2001, where he went 40-56), and the Berkshire Black Bears (going 14-31 in the first half and 10-34 in the second half of their first and only season in the Northern League in 2002); ultimately, he had a combined record of 271-314 as a manager.

Scott died July 28, 2013, in his hometown of Greenville. Although a cause of death was not announced at the time, Scott had been impaired by diabetes for several years. "In losing George Scott, we have lost one of the most talented, colorful, and popular players in our history," said Red Sox vice president/emeritus and team historian Dick Bresciani. "He had great power and agility, with a large personality and a large physical stature. He could light up a clubhouse with his smile, his laugh, and his humor – and he was the best defensive first baseman I have ever seen. We will miss him, and we send our condolences to his family."

== Family ==
Scott was the father of three sons: Dion, George III, and Brian.

Scott's grandson Deion Williams, who played shortstop for Redan High School in Georgia, was selected by the Washington Nationals in the 2011 MLB draft. Williams was converted into a pitcher and last pitched professionally for the Hagerstown Suns of the South Atlantic League in 2015.

On June 2, 2023, George III and Scott's 8-year old grandson Dante Hazard, were found dead in their home in Massachusetts.
