= Bill Holland (left-handed pitcher) =

American baseball player (1915–1997)

- Relief pitcher
- Born: June 4, 1915; Varina, North Carolina, U.S.
- Died: April 5, 1997 (aged 81); Goldsboro, North Carolina, U.S.
- Batted: Left Threw: Left

MLB debut
- September 17, 1939, for the Washington Senators

Last MLB appearance
- September 26, 1939, for the Washington Senators

MLB statistics
- Win–loss record: 0–1
- Earned run average: 11.25
- Strikeouts: 2
- Stats at Baseball Reference

Teams
- Washington Senators (1939)

William David Holland (June 4, 1915 – April 5, 1997) was an American relief pitcher in Major League Baseball who played for the Washington Senators during the 1939 season. Listed at 6'1", 190 lb., he batted and threw left-handed. He was born in Varina, North Carolina and died in Goldsboro, North Carolina.

Holland posted a 0–1 record with two strikeouts and an 11.25 ERA in 4.0 innings pitched.
