= Nokona Athletic Goods Company =

American sporting goods manufacturer

Nokona American Ball Gloves
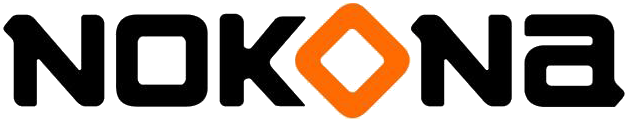
- Type: Private
- Industry: Sports equipment Leather
- Founded: 1926; 100 years ago
- Founder: Storey family
- Headquarters: Nocona, Texas, U.S.
- Products: Baseball gloves, belts, clothing, footwear
- Brands: S1 All-American; Walnut EP; EdgeX; X2 Platinum Edition; Alpha Select EP Platinum Edition; Hunting Season EP; Generation EP; Bloodline EP
- Subsidiaries: Nokona Leather Goods Nokona ShowBelts
- Website: nokona.com

Nokona Ballgloves is an American sporting goods manufacturer best known for its baseball and softball gloves, ShowBelts and Leather Goods.

Founded in 1926 as the Nocona Leather Goods Company, the company expanded into sporting goods in the early 1930s and began producing ballgloves in 1934.

== History ==
=== Origins & Leadership ===
The Nocona Leather Goods Company was founded in 1926 in Nocona, Texas, along the famed Chisholm Trail, by Cad McCall and T.B. Wilkes, initially producing leather goods including purses, wallets, and belts.

Bob Storey joined the company in the early 1930s and helped guide its expansion into sporting goods.

=== Celebrating 100 Years ===
In 2026, Nokona celebrated its 100th anniversary, marking a century since the company began producing leather goods in Texas in 1926.

Since producing its first ballglove in 1934, Nokona has continued handcrafting ballgloves in the United States, combining generations of traditional American craftsmanship with continued innovation in materials, design, and construction.

Nokona is currently the only major ballglove manufacturer producing its ballgloves in the United States.

=== The First Ballglove ===
In 1934, Nokona produced its first ballglove.

Company president Bob Storey had identified baseball as a growth opportunity for the leather goods business and helped establish ballglove manufacturing as a central part of the company.

=== The Passing Football ===
Nokona began producing footballs in 1935. Company president Bob Storey was involved in developing a narrower, more elongated football designed to make the forward pass easier to throw.

Storey was later inducted into the National Sporting Goods Hall of Fame in 1982 for his contributions to the sporting goods industry.

=== Growth of Nokona ===
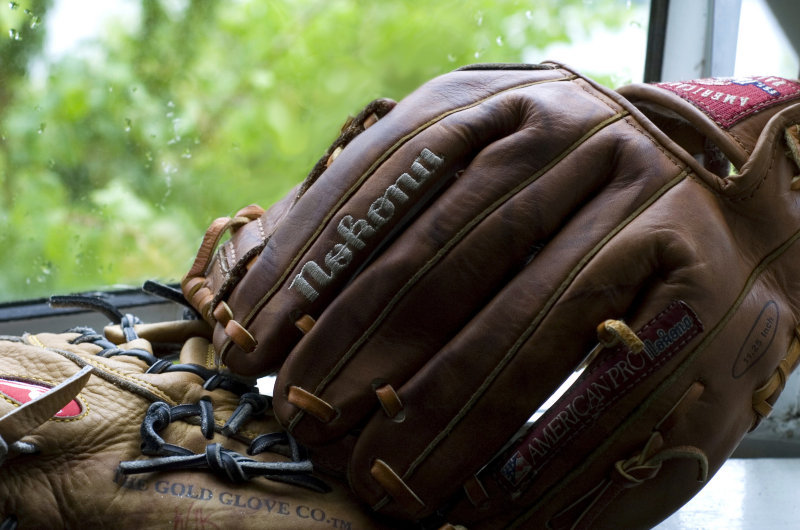
A Nokona ballglove produced in 1990

During World War II, Nokona received a government contract to manufacture ballgloves for U.S. military personnel. The company expanded production substantially during the war, and Nokona gloves were distributed to servicemen stationed in the United States and overseas.

Following the war, Nokona expanded its sporting goods line to include additional types of balls and protective equipment. The company also experimented with a range of leathers for its ballgloves, including kangaroo leather.

During the 1960s and 1970s, as many U.S. sporting goods manufacturers shifted production overseas, Nokona continued manufacturing ballgloves in the United States.

Nokona ballgloves have also appeared in film, including Field of Dreams and A League of Their Own.

=== Nokona Wrecking Crew of the 2000s ===
In 2007, Nokona introduced a line of maple bats associated with Major League Baseball players Vladimir Guerrero, David Ortiz, and Miguel Tejada, who were promoted collectively as the “Nokona Wrecking Crew.”

Guerrero won the 2007 Home Run Derby using a Nokona bat.

=== ShowGloves ===
In 2018, Nokona developed custom ShowGloves, an online configurator allowing customers to design a ballglove to their specifications.

The program offers a wide range of customization options, from classic signature leathers such as Walnut Crunch and Generation to AmericanKIP and rare exotic hides. Custom ShowGloves are made in the USA to each customer’s specifications.

=== EdgeX Construction ===
In 2020, Nokona introduced its patented EdgeX construction, an exposed-edge ballglove design that differs from traditional glove construction.

Traditional ballgloves are generally stitched inside out and then turned right-side out during manufacturing. EdgeX joins the glove’s components without turning the completed shell, leaving the stitched edges exposed.

The construction is designed to improve alignment between the glove’s outer shell and liner while creating a smooth pocket and reducing stress caused by the traditional turning process.

=== Patented Edge Precision ===
In 2025, Nokona introduced Patented Edge Precision, an evolution of its ballglove construction that combines hand-placed precision stitches with machine stitching.

During construction, the liner and shell are aligned and secured by hand at key points before the remaining seams are machine stitched. Like EdgeX, the glove is assembled without turning the completed shell inside out.

Edge Precision creates a smoother pocket and more natural hand feel by eliminating internal bulk, pressure points, and unnecessary stress on the leather. The construction is designed to allow the glove to break in as intended while maintaining its shape over time.

=== ShowBelts ===
Nokona brought ShowBelts to professional clubhouses in 2017. Handcrafted with the same premium leathers used in its ballgloves, ShowBelts offer extensive personalization options, including different leathers, colors, player numbers, names, logos, and other custom details.

As ShowBelts became increasingly common among professional players, baseball equipment publication What Pros Wear described them as “the unofficial belt of the MLB.”

In 2024, Nokona expanded its ShowBelts presence through game-belt sponsorship partnerships with Bobby Witt Jr. and Paul Skenes.

=== Nokona Leather Goods ===
Nokona reintroduced a broader leather goods line in the late 2010s, returning to the types of products the company manufactured when it was founded in 1926.

Nokona Leather Goods includes wallets, bags, totes, footwear, belts, outerwear, and other accessories made using many of the same premium leathers used in the company’s ballgloves.

== Professional Endorsements ==
Past Major League Baseball players associated with Nokona have included Nolan Ryan, Todd Walker, Jorge Sosa, and Jeff Fulchino.

Nokona also produced wooden bats used by players including David Ortiz, Miguel Cabrera, Vladimir Guerrero, and Miguel Tejada.

=== MLB Players ===
Current professional players who use Nokona:

- Paul Skenes (ShowBelts)
- Bobby Witt Jr. (ShowBelts)
- Taylor Ward
- Blake Treinen
- Garrett Whitlock
- Kyle Bradish
- Shane Baz
- Kevin Ginkel
- Cody Bradford
- Slade Caldwell
- Hagen Smith
- Cam Caminiti
- Chris Paddack
- Cole Irvin
- Scott Barlow
- Tim Mayza
- Tanner Banks
- Nick Mears
- Randy Dobnak
- Michael Kopech
- J. P. Feyereisen
- Joan Adon
- Jose Rojas
- Ryan Pressly
