= Orbach =

Orbach is a surname. Notable people with the surname include:

- Elaine Cancilla Orbach (1940–2009), American stage and musical theatre actress and dancer
- Jerry Orbach (1935–2004), American actor
- Maurice Orbach (1902–1979), British politician
- Nir Orbach (born 1970), Israeli politician
- Raymond L. Orbach (born 1934), American physicist and administrator
- Susie Orbach (born 1946), London-based psychotherapist, psychoanalyst, writer and social critic
- Uri Orbach (1960–2015), Israeli politician, journalist and writer
- Wilhelm Orbach (1894–1944), German chess master

== See also ==
- Ohrbach's department store
