= Michael Boroniec =

American sculptor (born 1983)

- Born: 1983 (age 42–43); Massachusetts
- Education: RISD
- Known for: Sculpture

Michael Boroniec (born 1983 in Pittsfield, Massachusetts) is an American sculptor who resides and works in Berkshire County, Massachusetts.

== Education and occupation ==
BFA in Ceramics from the Rhode Island School of Design, 2006.

== Work ==
Boroniec primarily works with ceramics, while also exploring other artistic media such as painting, printmaking, experimental, and time-based art. His work is a journalistic approach, a photograph or chronograph of time, primarily focusing on materials and the direct relationship to the viewer, location, and society. During the 2010 Gulf of Mexico oil spill, Boroniec created a collection of pieces titled "Crude Awakening" that includes terra cotta sculptures of birds covered in oil and a silk screened American flag portrayed by motor oil on canvas.

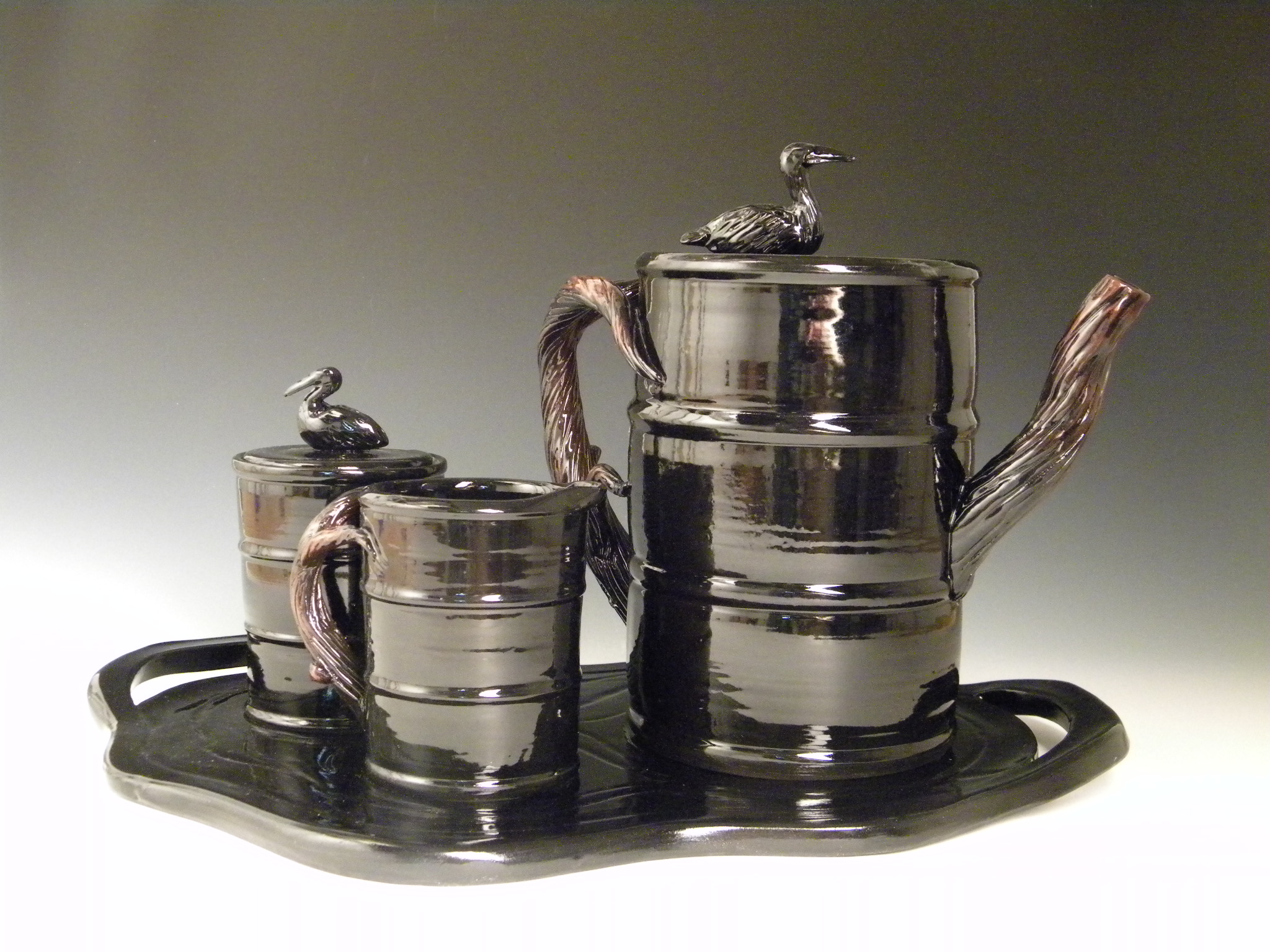
Crude Awakening Teapot

== Spatial Spirals ==
What began with teapots and a single spiral, has evolved into a series of vases that vary in form, degree of expansion, and number of coils. Each vessel is wheel thrown then deconstructed. This process reveals aspects of the vase that most rarely encounter. Within the walls, maker’s marks become evident and contribute to the texture. The resultant ribbon effect, reminiscent of a wheel trimming, lends fragility, elegance, and motion to a medium generally perceived as hard and heavy. This emphasizes a resistance of gravity, allowing negative space to unravel and become part of the form. The result is a body of sculptural objects, resembling and born of functional vessels.

== Exhibitions ==
Boroniec' work has been selected and shown nationally and internationally.

Berkshire Now; Michael Boroniec (solo)
Berkshire Museum (Sept. 5, 2015)

Lauren Clark Fine Art; (May 1, 2015)
May Bouquet (solo)

Eutectic Gallery; Slip Slab Coil Pinch Press Throw

Michael Boroniec; Spatial Spirals (solo) Lauren Clark Fine Art (July 27, 2014)

Mary Child Gallery (Aug. 2013) Works from De Barro

Select shows from Ferrin Gallery:

- ReObjectification; Art and Object (2010)
- The Things They Left Behind (2010)
- Crude Awakening (May, 2010)
- TEAPOT; Interpretations (July, 2009)
- $mall Works (December, 2008)
- Studio Pottery Invitational (November, 2008)
- Fresh: (June, 2008)

Other:

- Perfect Fit; Shoes Tell Stories (April 30, 2010 – Sept 12, 2010), Albany Institute of History and Art / Nicolyasen Museum of Art and Discovery / Fuller Craft Museum. Curator: Wendy Tarlow Kaplan)
- RISD New England Alumni Biennial 2009, Arsenal Center, Watertown, Massachusetts, Curator: Dina Deitsch, Curator at DeCordova Museum
- Printmaking Today (August, 2008), Dedalo Center for Contemporary Art, The Museum of Castiglione, Abruzzo, Italy
- Pittsfield Contemporary (June, 2008), Lichtenstein Art Center, Pittsfield, Massachusetts
- RISD ROUTES (January, 2007), Fuller Craft Museum. Brockton, Ma., Curator: David Revere McFadden, Museum of Art and Design, New York City
- Woods – Gerry Gallery (August, 2006), Providence, Rhode Island
- Rhode Island School of Design Triennial (February, 2005), Providence, Rhode Island
