= Pittsfield, Massachusetts =

Pittsfield
- City
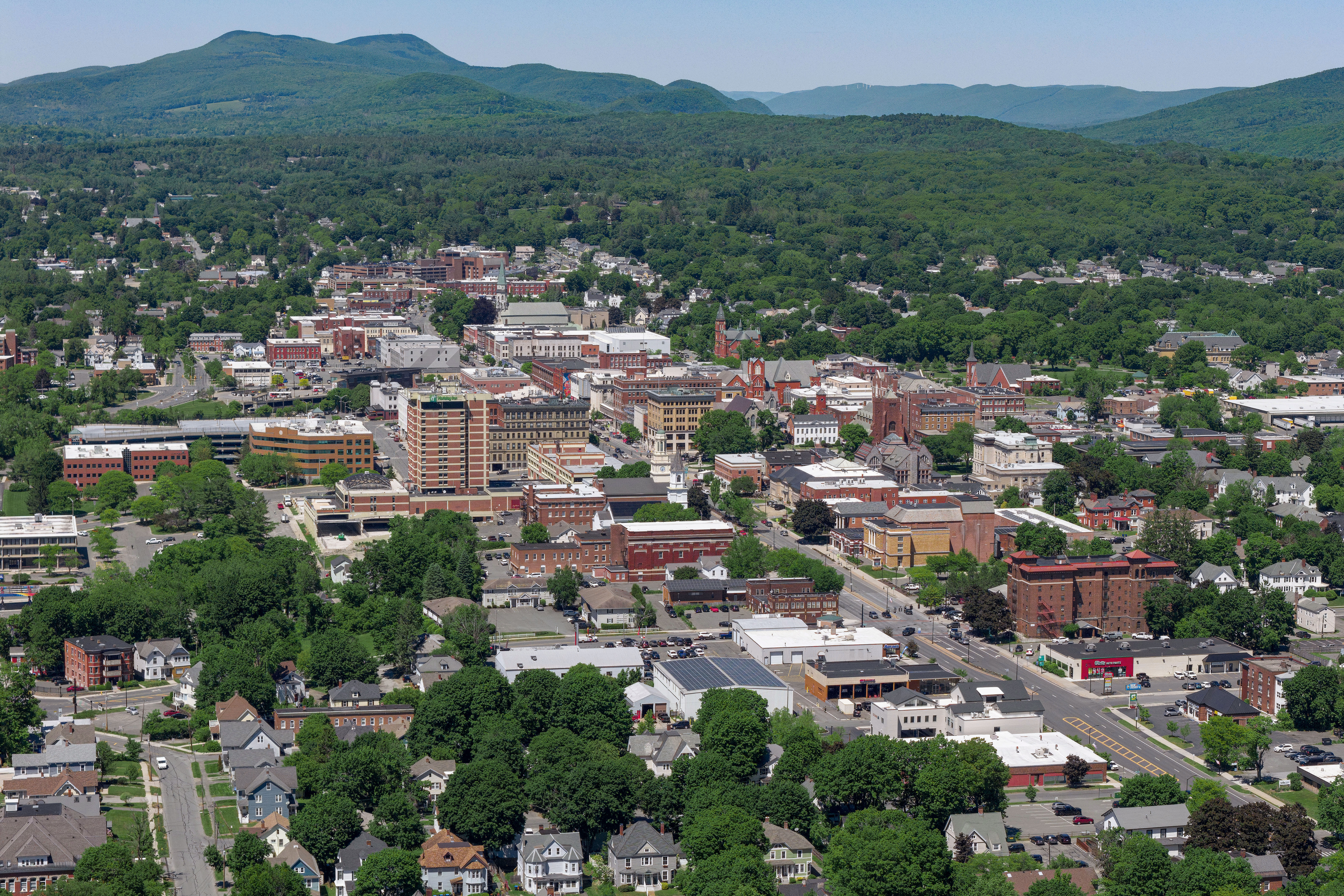
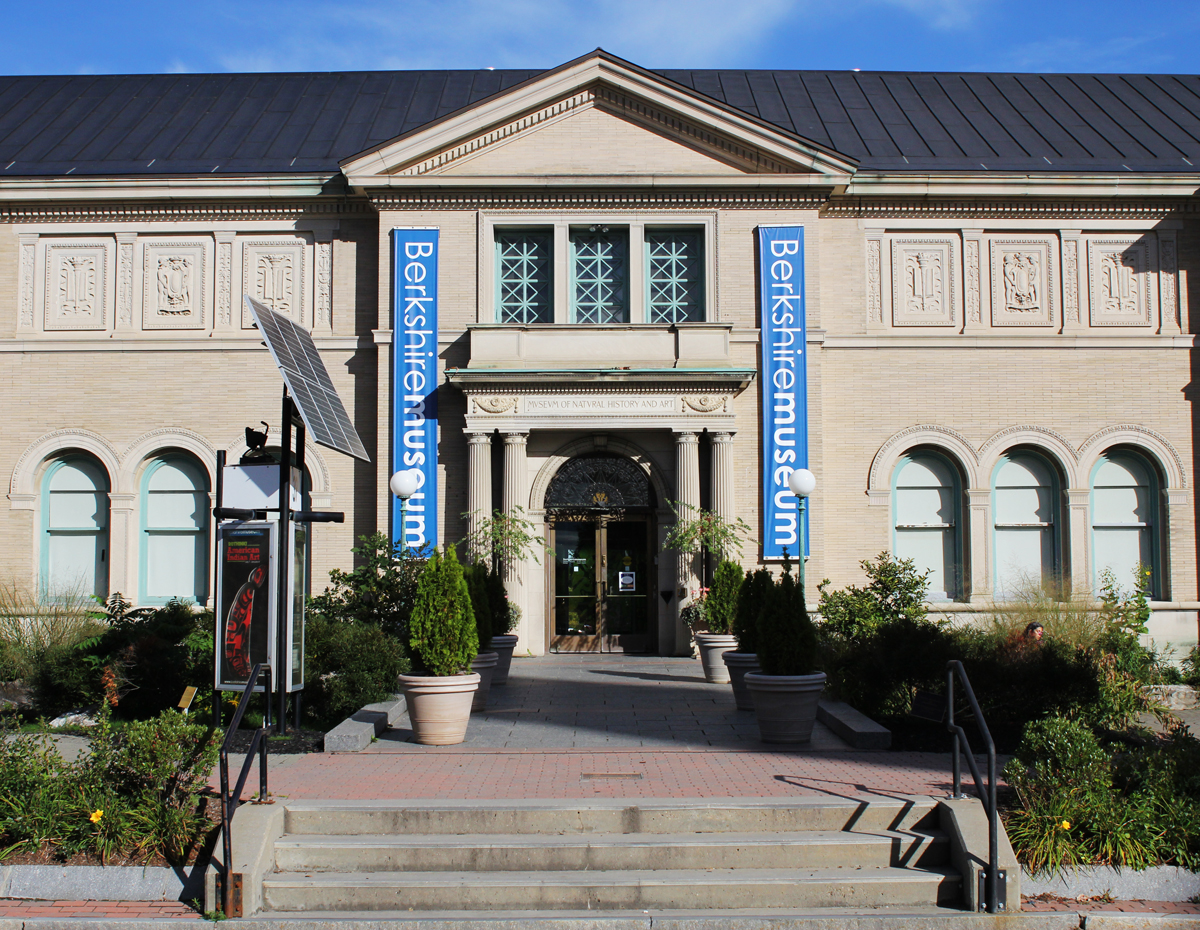
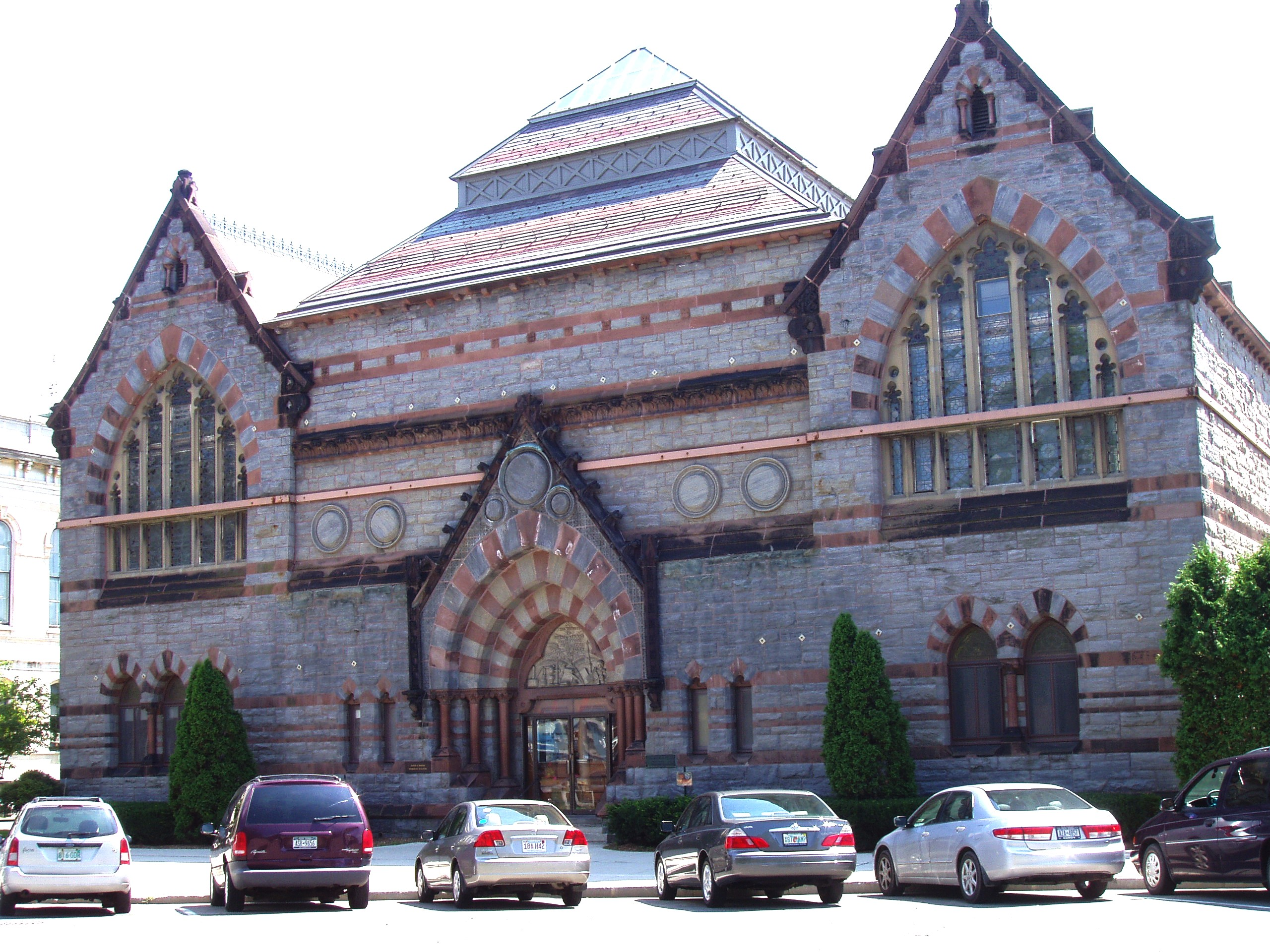
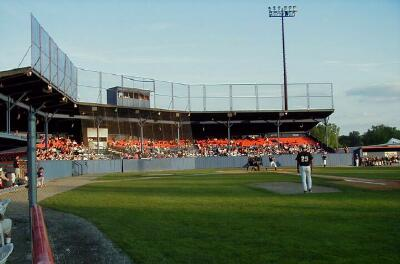
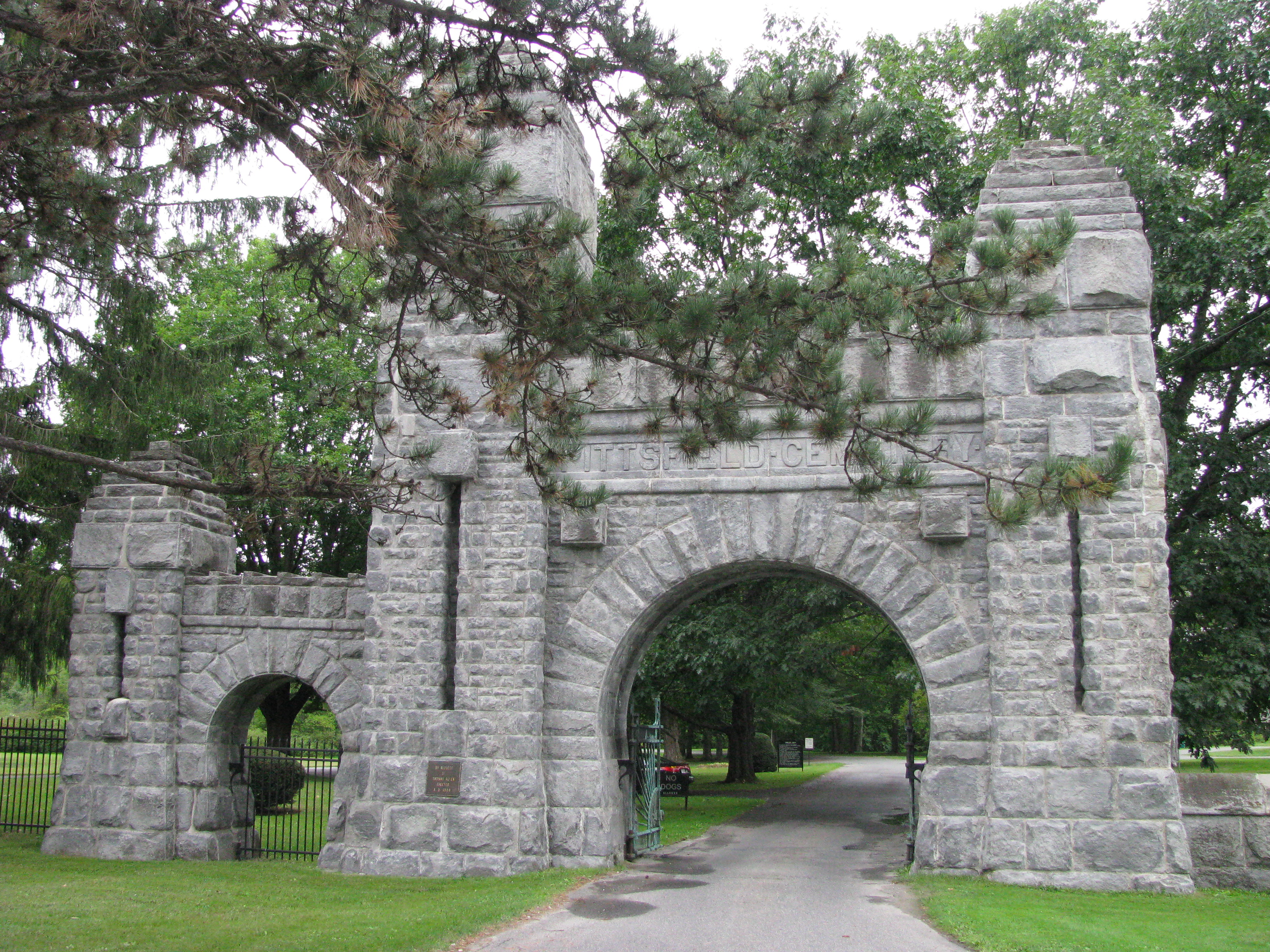
- Downtown Berkshire Museum Berkshire Athenaeum Wahconah Park Pittsfield Cemetery

- Seal
- Motto: "Benigno Numine" (Latin) 'Benign Power'
- Location in Berkshire County and the state of Massachusetts.

- Location in Massachusetts Location in the United States
- Coordinates: 42°27′N 73°15′W
- Country: United States
- State: Massachusetts
- County: Berkshire
- Settled: 1752
- Incorporated (town): 1761
- Incorporated (city): 1891
- Named for: William Pitt, 1st Earl of Chatham

Government
  - Type: Mayor–council
  - Mayor: Peter Marchetti (D)

Area
  - Total: 42.46 sq mi (109.98 km^{2})
  - Land: 40.47 sq mi (104.81 km^{2})
  - Water: 2.00 sq mi (5.17 km^{2})
- Elevation: 1,040 ft (317 m)

Population (2020)
  - Total: 43,927
  - Density: 1,085/sq mi (419.1/km^{2})
- Time zone: UTC−5 (Eastern)
  - Summer (DST): UTC−4 (Eastern)
- ZIP Code: 01201
- Area code: 413
- FIPS code: 25-53960
- GNIS feature ID: 0607643
- Website: www.pittsfieldma.gov

Pittsfield is the most populous city in and the county seat of Berkshire County, Massachusetts, United States. It is the principal city of the Pittsfield, Massachusetts Metropolitan Statistical Area, which encompasses Berkshire County. Pittsfield's population was 43,927 at the 2020 census. Although its population has declined in recent decades, Pittsfield remains the third-largest municipality in Western Massachusetts, behind only Springfield and Chicopee.

In 2017, the Arts Vibrancy Index compiled by the National Center for Arts Research ranked Pittsfield and Berkshire County as the number-one medium-sized community in the nation for the arts.

== History ==
The Mohicans, an Algonquian people, inhabited the area that would later come to comprise Pittsfield until the early 18th century, when the population was greatly reduced by war and disease brought by European Colonists. Many migrated westward or were subjugated to live on the fringes of their land.

In 1738, wealthy Bostonian Colonel Jacob Wendell bought 24,000 acres (97 km^{2}) of land known, originally as "Pontoosuck," from a Mohican word meaning "a field or haven for winter deer," as a speculative investment. He planned to subdivide and resell to others who would settle there. He formed a partnership with Philip Livingston, a wealthy kinsman from Albany, New York, and Col. John Stoddard of Northampton, Massachusetts, who had claim to 1,000 acres (4.0 km^{2}) here.

A group of young armed militia men came and began to clear the land in 1743, but the threat of Indian resistance around the time of King George's War soon forced them to leave, and the land remained unoccupied by Englishmen for several years.

Soon, many colonists arrived from Westfield, Massachusetts, and a village began to grow, which was incorporated as Pontoosuck Plantation in 1753 by Solomon Deming, Simeon Crofoot, Stephen Crofoot, Charles Goodrich, Jacob Ensign, Samuel Taylor, and Elias Woodward. Mrs. Deming was the first and the last of the original colonists, dying in March 1818 at the age of 92. Solomon Deming died in 1815 at the age of 96.

Pittsfield was incorporated in 1761. Royal Governor Sir Francis Bernard named Pittsfield after British nobleman and politician William Pitt. By 1761 there were 200 residents and the plantation became the Township of Pittsfield.

By the end of the Revolutionary War, Pittsfield grew to nearly 2,000 residents, including Colonel John Brown, who began accusing Benedict Arnold of being a traitor in 1776, several years before Arnold defected to the British. Brown wrote in his winter 1776–77 handbill, "Money is this man's God, and to get enough of it he would sacrifice his country."

Pittsfield was primarily turned into an agricultural area because of the many brooks that flowed into the Housatonic River; the landscape was dotted with mills that produced lumber, grist, paper, and textiles. With the introduction of Merino sheep from Spain in 1807, the area became the center of woolen manufacturing in the United States, an industry that dominated the community's economy for almost a century.

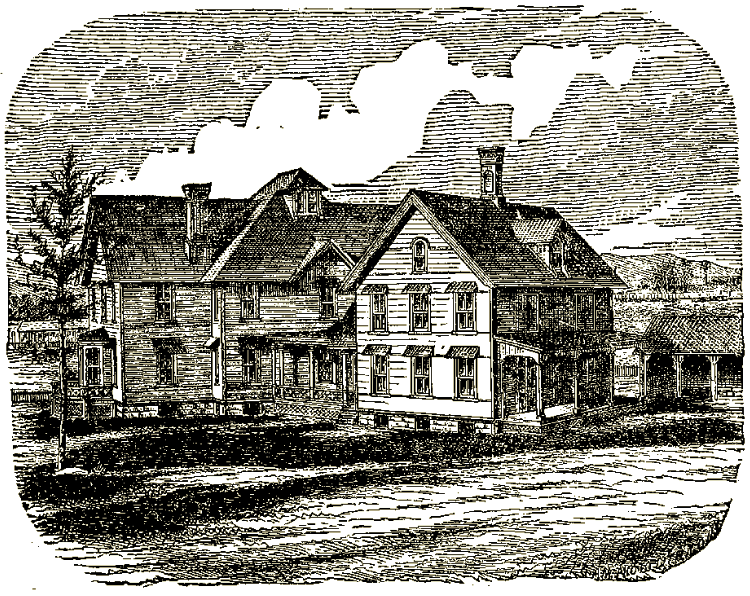
House of Mercy, first cottage hospital in the U.S.

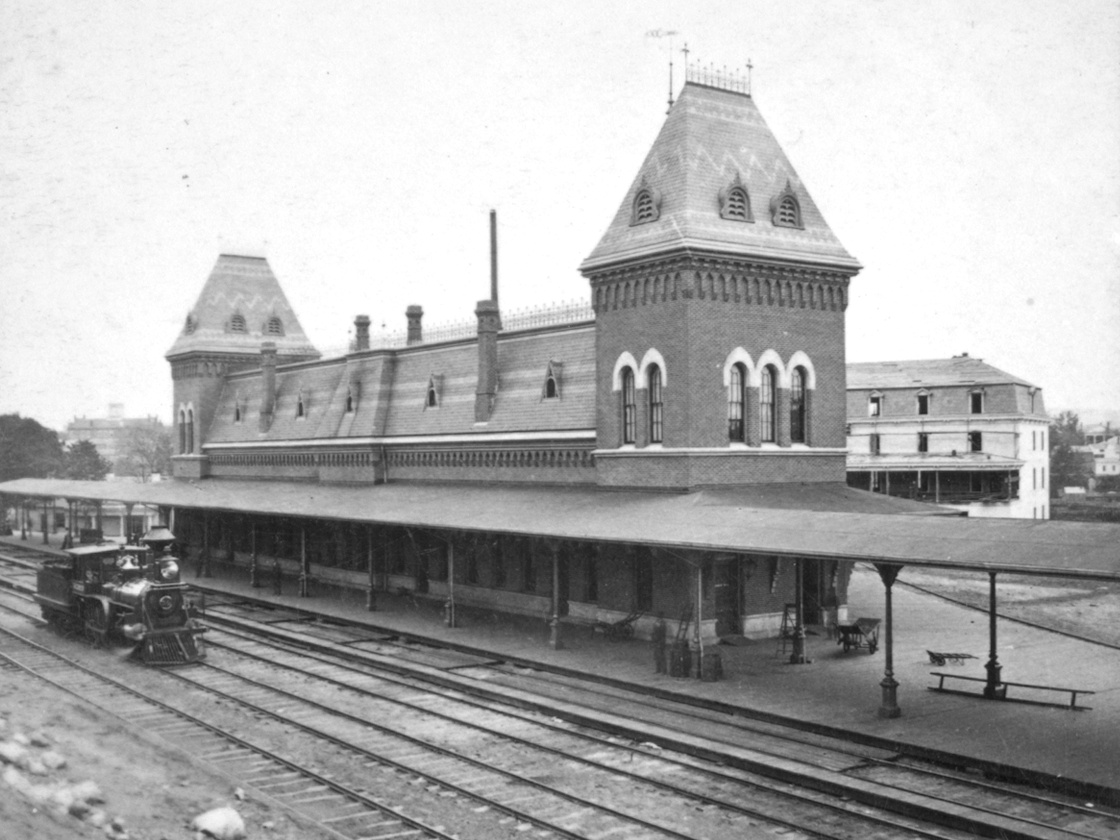
Pittsfield Union Station, c. 1880

The town was a bustling metropolis by the late 19th century. In 1891, the City of Pittsfield was incorporated and William Stanley Jr., who had recently relocated his Electric Manufacturing Company to Pittsfield from Great Barrington, produced the first electric transformer. Stanley's enterprise was the forerunner of internationally known corporate giant General Electric (GE). Thanks to the success of GE, Pittsfield's population in 1930 had grown to over 50,000. While GE Advanced Materials (now owned by SABIC-Innovative Plastics, a subsidiary of the Riyadh-based Saudi Basic Industries Corporation) is still present in the city, a workforce that once topped 13,000 was reduced to less than 50 with the demise and/or relocation of General Electric's transformer and aerospace portions, and the subsequent announcement of the relocation of SABIC's headquarters from Pittsfield to Houston, Texas, on October 8, 2015.

General Dynamics occupies many of the old GE buildings and its workforce is expanding. Much of General Dynamics' local success is based on the receipt of government contracts related to its advanced information systems. In September 2018, Massachusetts Governor Charlie Baker, Massachusetts Lieutenant Governor Karyn Polito, and other Baker administration officials attended the groundbreaking of a $13.7 million project to build a life sciences and advanced manufacturing center in the city.

=== 1902 presidential incident ===
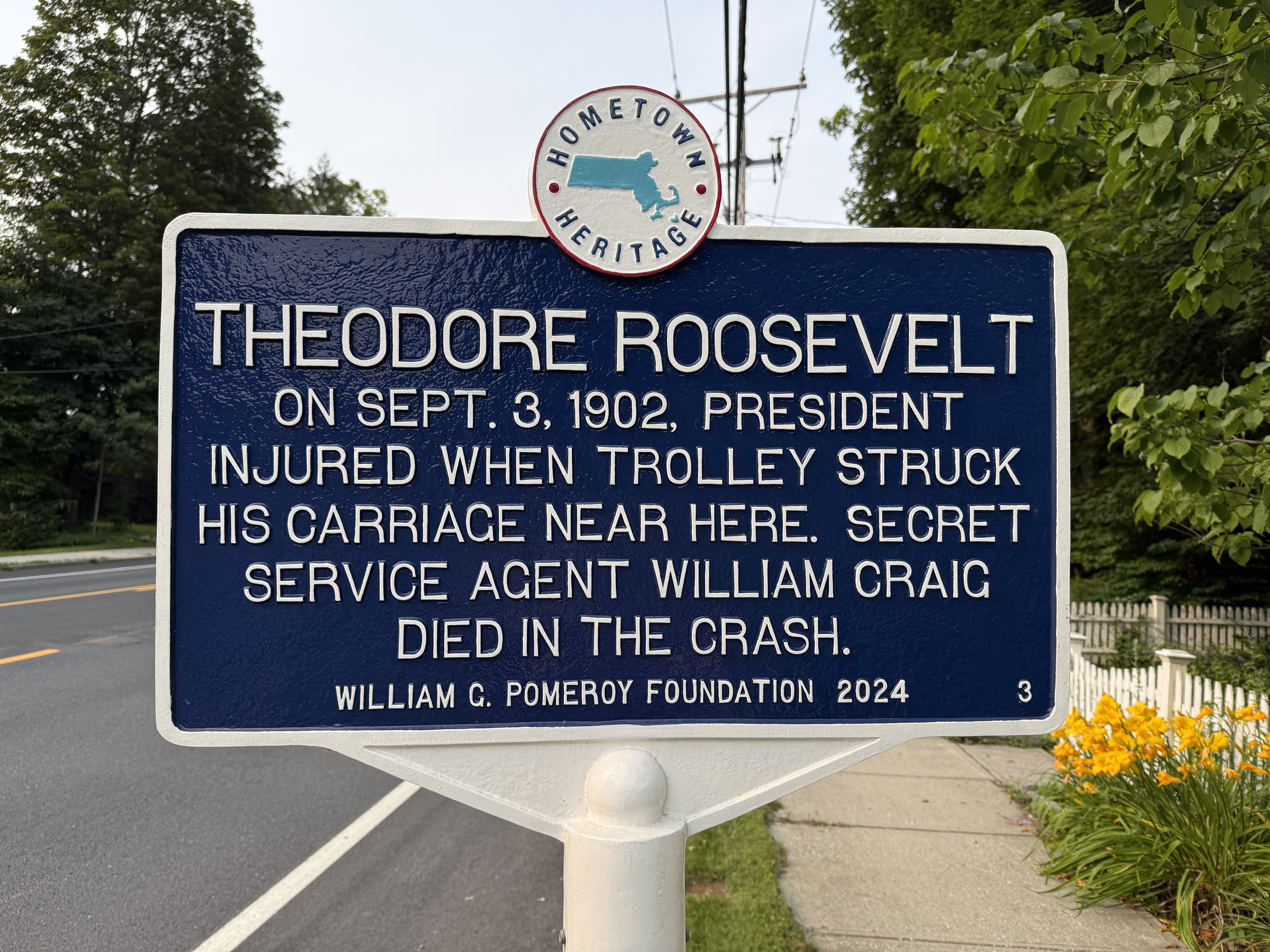
Hometown Heritage sign on South St. in Pittsfield, MA. It provides passerby with details about the 1902 event of a trolley accident that involved President Theodore Roosevelt.

On September 3, 1902, at 10:15 am, during a two-week tour through New England campaigning for Republican congressmen, the barouche transporting President Theodore Roosevelt from downtown Pittsfield to the Pittsfield Country Club collided head-on with a trolley. Roosevelt, Massachusetts Governor Winthrop Murray Crane, secretary to the president George Bruce Cortelyou, and bodyguard William Craig were thrown into the street. Craig was killed; he was the first Secret Service agent killed while on a presidential protection detail. Roosevelt, whose face and left shin were badly bruised, nearly came to blows with the trolley motorman, Euclid Madden. Madden was later charged with manslaughter to which he pleaded guilty. He was sentenced to six months in jail and a heavy fine.

=== Baseball in Pittsfield ===
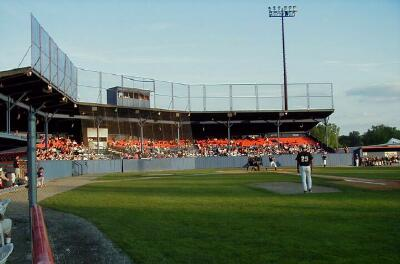
Wahconah Park (built in 1919)

In 2004, historian John Thorn discovered a reference to a 1791 bylaw prohibiting anyone from playing "baseball" within 80 yards (73 m) of the new meeting house in Pittsfield. A reference librarian, AnnMarie Harris, found the actual bylaw in the Berkshire Athenaeum library and its age was verified by researchers at the Williamstown Art Conservation Center. If authentic and if actually referring to a recognizable version of the modern game, the 1791 document would be, as of 2004, the earliest known reference to the game in America. (See Origins of baseball.) The document is available on the Pittsfield Library's web site.

A finding that baseball was invented in 1839 by Abner Doubleday in Cooperstown, New York, provided the rationale for baseball centennial celebrations in 1939 including the opening of a National Baseball Hall of Fame and Museum in that city. Few historians ever believed it and even the Hall's vice president, Jeff Idelson, has stated that "Baseball wasn't really born anywhere."

In 1859, the first intercollegiate baseball game was played in Pittsfield. Amherst defeated Williams College, 73–32.

Ulysses Frank Grant

Ulysses Frank Grant, born August 1, 1865, in Pittsfield (died May 27, 1937), was an African American baseball player in the 19th century who played in the International League and for various independent teams.

Professional baseball was played in Pittsfield's Wahconah Park from 1894 through 2003. Teams included the early Pittsfield Colts and Pittsfield Hillies, the Pittsfield Electrics of the 1940s, the Pittsfield Red Sox from 1965 to 1969 with such A-league players and future major leaguers as George Scott, Carlton Fisk, and Reggie Smith, the Pittsfield Senators (later Rangers) of the 1970s, and the 1985–1988 AA Pittsfield Cubs featuring future stars Mark Grace and Rafael Palmeiro. From 1989 to 2001, the Pittsfield Mets and Pittsfield Astros (2001 only) represented the city in the New York–Penn League. The Astros have since moved to Troy, New York, and are now known as the Tri-City ValleyCats.

In 2005, Wahconah Park became the home stadium of the Pittsfield Dukes, a summer collegiate baseball franchise of the New England Collegiate Baseball League owned by Dan Duquette, former Boston Red Sox general manager. The Dukes had played the 2004 season in Hinsdale, Massachusetts, as the Berkshire Dukes. In 2009, the franchise changed its name to the Pittsfield American Defenders. The American Defenders' name refers to both the United States military and a line of baseball gloves produced by Nocona Athletic Goods Company. Duquette's ownership group also owned the American Defenders of New Hampshire, members of the independent Can-Am League.

Since 2012, Wahconah Park has been the home of the Pittsfield Suns of the Futures Collegiate Baseball League.

Mark Belanger, eight-time Gold Glove winning shortstop for the Baltimore Orioles, Turk Wendell, relief pitcher for the New York Mets, and Tom Grieve, outfielder for the Texas Rangers, were all from Pittsfield.

The love of baseball in the Berkshires, especially Pittsfield, extends to all ages. Pittsfield has two Little League teams, Pittsfield American and National, which are the two dominant powers in Berkshire County Little League and Western Massachusetts. The 2022 Pittsfield 13U Babe Ruth baseball team made a run to the Babe Ruth 13U World Series Championship game, winning the New England Regional and going to the Title Series, before losing to Kado, Hawaii. Pittsfield hosted the 2023 Babe Ruth 15U New England Regional Tournament at Wahconah Park. Pittsfield received an automatic bid for hosting and advanced to the championship game, but fell to Norwalk, Conn.

Both Pittsfield high schools are known for their baseball and softball prowess. Taconic High School won state championships in 2017 and 2019 and reached the Final Four in 2023. It was the No. 1 overall seed in the Massachusetts Interscholastic Athletic Association (MIAA) Division III bracket in 2022 and beat city-rival Pittsfield High three times: twice in the regular season and once again in the PVIAC Western Massachusetts Class B Championship Game in front of a crowd of over 3,500 at Wahconah Park. However, the two teams met in the Division III Sweet 16 and Pittsfield High pulled off the upset to send its crosstown rival home.

== Geography ==
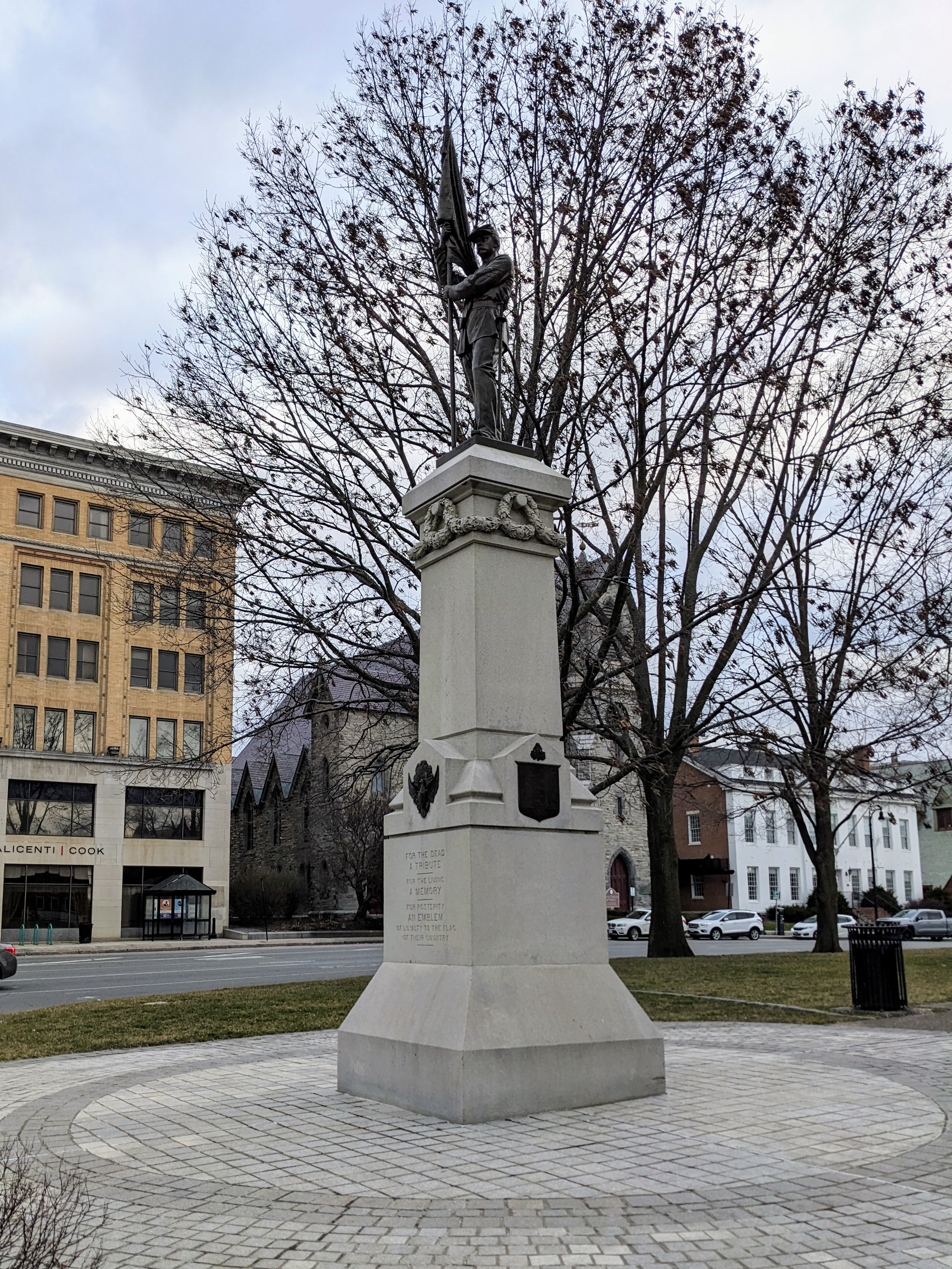
Civil War Monument in Park Square

Pittsfield is at 42°27′N 73°15′W (42.4522, −73.2515).

According to the United States Census Bureau, the city has an area of 42.5 square miles (110.0 km^{2}), of which 2.0 square miles (5.2 km^{2}), or 4.70%, are covered by water. Pittsfield is bordered by Lanesborough to the north, Dalton to the east, Washington to the southeast, Lenox to the south, Richmond to the southwest, and Hancock to the west. Pittsfield is 48 miles (77 km) northwest of Springfield, 99 miles (159 km) west of Worcester, 135 miles (217 km) west of Boston, and 39 miles (63 km) east of Albany, New York.

Most of the population occupies roughly one-quarter of the city's land. Pittsfield lies at the confluence of the east and west branches of the Housatonic River, which flows south from the city towards its mouth at Long Island Sound, some 149 miles (240 km) distant. The eastern branch leads down from the hills, and the western branch is fed from Onota Lake and Pontoosuc Lake, which lies partly in Lanesborough. Like much of western Berkshire County, the city lies between the Berkshire Hills to the east and the Taconic Range to the west. Sections of the Housatonic Valley Wildlife Management Area dot the banks of the river. The western portion of the city contains Pittsfield State Forest, an 11,000-acre (4,500 ha) facility with hiking and cross-country skiing trails, camping, picnic areas, and a beach for swimming.

Pittsfield is at the crossroads of U.S. Route 7 and U.S. Route 20, which intersect in the city. Massachusetts Route 8 passes through the northeastern corner of town, with a portion of it combined with Route 9, the central east-west road through the western part of the state, which terminates in the city at Route 20. Route 41 begins in the southwestern corner of town, heading south from Route 20. The nearest interstate highway, Interstate 90 (the Massachusetts Turnpike) is about 10 miles (16 km) south, in Lee.

Long-distance ground transportation in Pittsfield is based at the Joseph Scelsi Intermodal Transportation Center, which serves as the station for Amtrak trains and Peter Pan buses. The Berkshire Regional Transit Authority, the transit provider for Pittsfield and vicinity, is based at the Intermodal Center and also uses it as a hub for most of its lines. Rail freight transportation is provided by CSX Transportation and the Housatonic Railroad.

The fixed-base operator at Pittsfield Municipal Airport offers access to the region via private and chartered aircraft ranging from single-engined piston to multiple-engined jet planes. They also offer scenic rides and flight training. The nearest airport with national service is Albany International Airport.

=== Climate ===
Pittsfield has a humid continental climate (Dfb). Winters are harsh because of the city's high elevation, at 1,039 ft (317 m), with an average annual snowfall of 73.0 inches (1,850 mm) and temperatures dipping to 0 °F (−18 °C) or colder 13 times per year. Summers, however, are typically warm and pleasant, with temperatures reaching 90 °F (32 °C) just six times per year. The record high and record low are 101 °F (38 °C) and −26 °F (−32 °C), recorded on July 23, 1926, and February 15, 1943, respectively. Over the course of a year, 173 days have measurable precipitation.

Climate data for Pittsfield Municipal Airport, Massachusetts, 1991–2020 normals, extremes 1925–present
Month	Jan	Feb	Mar	Apr	May	Jun	Jul	Aug	Sep	Oct	Nov	Dec	Year
Record high °F (°C)	65 (18)	73 (23)	81 (27)	91 (33)	94 (34)	100 (38)	101 (38)	100 (38)	95 (35)	85 (29)	78 (26)	67 (19)	101 (38)
Mean maximum °F (°C)	53.8 (12.1)	53.1 (11.7)	62.5 (16.9)	78.0 (25.6)	85.0 (29.4)	87.6 (30.9)	88.9 (31.6)	87.4 (30.8)	84.5 (29.2)	75.0 (23.9)	66.1 (18.9)	57.5 (14.2)	90.5 (32.5)
Mean daily maximum °F (°C)	30.1 (−1.1)	33.1 (0.6)	41.7 (5.4)	55.2 (12.9)	67.0 (19.4)	74.6 (23.7)	79.3 (26.3)	77.6 (25.3)	70.4 (21.3)	58.3 (14.6)	46.6 (8.1)	35.5 (1.9)	55.8 (13.2)
Daily mean °F (°C)	22.0 (−5.6)	24.1 (−4.4)	32.4 (0.2)	44.5 (6.9)	55.7 (13.2)	63.9 (17.7)	68.7 (20.4)	67.1 (19.5)	59.7 (15.4)	48.4 (9.1)	37.9 (3.3)	28.2 (−2.1)	46.1 (7.8)
Mean daily minimum °F (°C)	13.9 (−10.1)	15.0 (−9.4)	23.1 (−4.9)	33.8 (1.0)	44.4 (6.9)	53.1 (11.7)	58.0 (14.4)	56.5 (13.6)	48.9 (9.4)	38.5 (3.6)	29.2 (−1.6)	20.9 (−6.2)	36.3 (2.4)
Mean minimum °F (°C)	−7.0 (−21.7)	−2.8 (−19.3)	4.7 (−15.2)	21.6 (−5.8)	30.7 (−0.7)	39.8 (4.3)	47.9 (8.8)	45.6 (7.6)	34.7 (1.5)	24.1 (−4.4)	14.5 (−9.7)	2.5 (−16.4)	−8.7 (−22.6)
Record low °F (°C)	−22 (−30)	−26 (−32)	−10 (−23)	10 (−12)	24 (−4)	31 (−1)	40 (4)	32 (0)	23 (−5)	14 (−10)	−1 (−18)	−23 (−31)	−26 (−32)
Average precipitation inches (mm)	2.67 (68)	2.52 (64)	3.08 (78)	3.38 (86)	3.79 (96)	4.58 (116)	4.18 (106)	3.82 (97)	4.50 (114)	4.56 (116)	3.52 (89)	3.63 (92)	44.23 (1,122)
Average snowfall inches (cm)	18.2 (46)	19.3 (49)	13.4 (34)	3.1 (7.9)	0.0 (0.0)	0.0 (0.0)	0.0 (0.0)	0.0 (0.0)	0.0 (0.0)	0.1 (0.25)	3.5 (8.9)	15.2 (39)	72.8 (185.05)
Average precipitation days (≥ 0.01 in)	12.1	11.8	13.0	13.5	14.1	14.9	14.8	14.7	13.4	13.5	12.2	13.4	161.4
Source 1: NOAA
Source 2: National Weather Service

=== Housatonic River ===
==== Background and historical overview ====
Flowing through a historically rural area, the Housatonic River attracted increased industrialization in the late 19th century. William Stanley Jr., founded the Stanley Electric Manufacturing Company in 1890 at Pittsfield. The company manufactured small transformers, electrical motors and appliances. In 1903, GE acquired Stanley Electric and subsequently operated three major manufacturing operations in Pittsfield: transformer, ordnance, and plastics.

==== Environmental issues ====
During the mid-20th century, the Housatonic River and its floodplain were contaminated with polychlorinated biphenyls (PCBs) and other hazardous substances released from the General Electric Company (GE) facility in Pittsfield. The contaminated area, known as the General Electric/Housatonic River Site, includes the GE manufacturing facility; the Housatonic River, its riverbanks and floodplains from Pittsfield to Long Island Sound, and former river oxbows that have since been filled in; Allendale School; Silver Lake; and other contaminated areas.

The highest concentrations of PCBs in the Housatonic River are found from the site of the GE plant in Pittsfield to Woods Pond in Lenox, Massachusetts, where they were measured up to 140 mg/kg (140 ppm). About 50% of PCBs, estimated to be about 11,000 pounds, in the river are retained in the sediment behind Woods Pond dams. Birds and fish that live in and around the river contain significant levels of PCBs.

==== Consent decree and cleanup ====
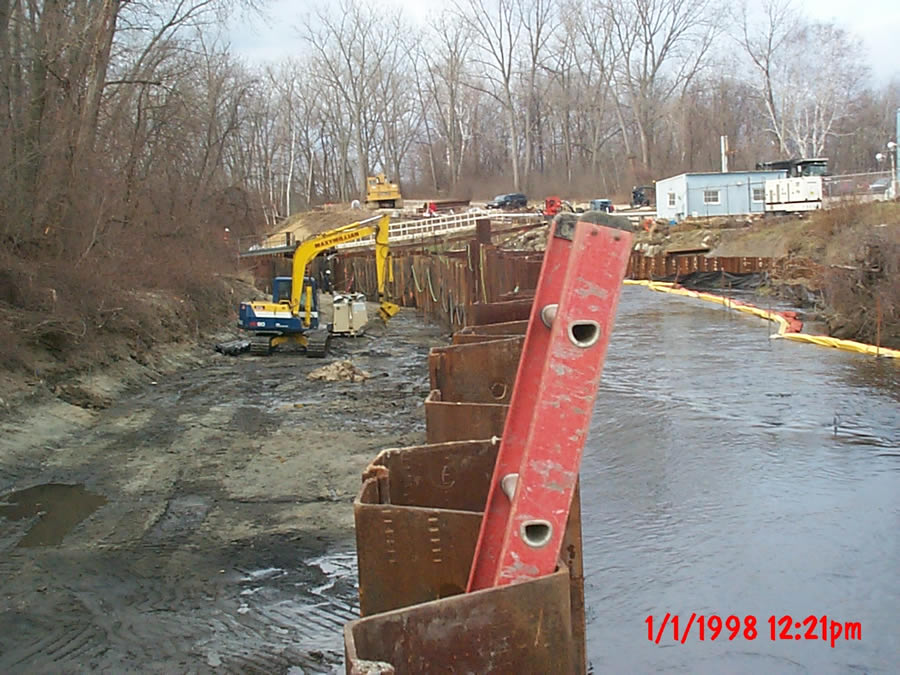
Cleanup activity at one of the GE Pittsfield plant Superfund sites on the Housatonic River.

Starting in 1991, legal proceedings by the U.S. Environmental Protection Agency (EPA) established the General Electric/Housatonic River Site. Initial cleanup work began in 1996 when EPA issued a unilateral order requiring GE to remove highly contaminated sediments and bank soils. EPA added the site to its Superfund list in September 1997.

The year 1999 was a milestone for Pittsfield, when negotiations between EPA, the state, General Electric, and the city resulted in a settlement agreement, valued at over $250 million, to clean up Pittsfield and the Housatonic River. The settlement was memorialized in a consent decree entered in federal court the following year, making it a binding legal agreement. Between 2005 and 2018 GE completed remediation and restoration of the 10 manufacturing plant areas within the city, and continues to conduct inspection, monitoring and maintenance activities.

Cleanup of the polluted downstream river areas is not complete as of 2025. Following a public comment period, EPA issued a permit in December 2020 for the final cleanup phase. In 2021, two citizen groups, which had been parties to the settlement, filed an appeal of the permit that criticized the design of a landfill planned for Berkshire County. In February 2022 the US Environmental Appeals Board (EAB) denied the appeal. Following the EAB ruling, EPA continued to design the new PCB disposal facility and conducted public meetings in 2022. Two citizen groups appealed the EAB decision to the First Circuit Court of Appeals, and in July 2023 the court rejected the plaintiffs' challenge. EPA issued a conditional approval in March 2025 for GE's proposed disposal facility in Lee. Site preparation activities are expected to start in late 2025.

==== Groundwater and long-term monitoring ====
In the years since the settlement, the EPA, state agencies, the City, and GE accomplished one of the largest and most complex cleanups in the country. Cleanup work on the first previously PCB-laden half mile of the Housatonic River, adjacent to the GE facility, was completed in September 2002. $90 million was spent cleaning the 1.5-mile (2.4 km) reach between Lyman Street and Fred Garner Park, which was completed in June 2007. Biological and sediment samples showed reductions of approximately 99% of PCB concentrations. GE removed contaminated soil and restored 27 residential properties abutting the river. As of 2006 over 115,000 cubic yards (88,000 m^{3}) of PCB-contaminated sediment, bank, and floodplain soil have been removed from the river and residential property.

== Demographics ==
Historical population
Year	Pop.	±%
1790	1,992	—
1800	2,261	+13.5%
1810	2,665	+17.9%
1820	2,768	+3.9%
1830	3,559	+28.6%
1840	3,747	+5.3%
1850	5,872	+56.7%
1860	8,045	+37.0%
1870	11,112	+38.1%
1880	13,364	+20.3%
1890	17,281	+29.3%
1900	21,766	+26.0%
1910	32,121	+47.6%
1920	41,763	+30.0%
1930	49,677	+18.9%
1940	49,684	+0.0%
1950	53,348	+7.4%
1960	57,879	+8.5%
1970	57,020	−1.5%
1980	51,974	−8.8%
1990	48,622	−6.4%
2000	45,793	−5.8%
2010	44,737	−2.3%
2020	43,927	−1.8%
2024*	43,121	−1.8%
* = population estimate. Source: United States census records and Population Estimates Program data. Source: U.S. Decennial Census

=== 2020 census ===
As of the 2020 census, Pittsfield had a population of 43,927. The median age was 44.2 years. 19.3% of residents were under the age of 18 and 21.2% of residents were 65 years of age or older. For every 100 females there were 94.4 males, and for every 100 females age 18 and over there were 92.5 males age 18 and over.

96.2% of residents lived in urban areas, while 3.8% lived in rural areas.

There were 19,716 households in Pittsfield, of which 23.8% had children under the age of 18 living in them. Of all households, 34.2% were married-couple households, 22.7% were households with a male householder and no spouse or partner present, and 33.7% were households with a female householder and no spouse or partner present. About 37.3% of all households were made up of individuals and 16.1% had someone living alone who was 65 years of age or older.

There were 21,738 housing units, of which 9.3% were vacant. The homeowner vacancy rate was 1.5% and the rental vacancy rate was 7.1%.

Racial composition as of the 2020 census
Race	Number	Percent
White	34,924	79.5%
Black or African American	3,002	6.8%
American Indian and Alaska Native	103	0.2%
Asian	630	1.4%
Native Hawaiian and Other Pacific Islander	7	0.0%
Some other race	1,768	4.0%
Two or more races	3,493	8.0%
Hispanic or Latino (of any race)	3,539	8.1%

=== 2017 estimates ===
The racial makeup of the city in 2017 was 87.4% white (84.4% non-Hispanic white), 4.7% black, 0.4% Native American, 2.0% Asian (0.6% Chinese, 0.5% Indian, 0.3% Pakistani, 0.2% Filipino, 0.2% Korean, 0.1% Vietnamese), 0.02% Pacific Islander, 2.0% from other races, and 3.5% from two or more races. Hispanics and Latinos of any race were 6.0% of the population (1.9% Puerto Rican, 0.9% Mexican, 0.6% Ecuadorian, 0.5% Dominican, 0.4% Spanish, 0.3% Peruvian, 0.3% Honduran, 0.2% Colombian, 0.2% Salvadoran, 0.1% Cuban). The ten largest ancestry groups in the city were Irish (22.5%), Italian (17.5%), French (11.7%), German (9.9%), English (8.6%), Polish (6.7%), American (4.1%), French-Canadian (3.7%), Scottish (1.7%), and Russian (1.5%). Immigrants accounted for 7.3% of the population. The ten most common countries of origin for immigrants in the city were, Ecuador, China, Mexico, the Dominican Republic, India, El Salvador, Canada, Ghana, and Brazil.

=== 2010 census ===
In 2010, there were 19,704 households, of which 27.3% had children under the age of 18 living with them, 42.9% were married couples living together, 13.1% had a female householder with no husband present, and 40.0% were non-families. 34.0% of all households were made up of individuals, and 14.3% had someone living alone who was 65 years of age or older. The average household size was 2.26 and the average family size was 2.89.

In 2010 in the city, the population was spread out, with 23.2% under the age of 18, 6.9% from 18 to 24, 28.3% from 25 to 44, 23.0% from 45 to 64, and 18.6% who were 65 years of age or older. The median age was 40 years. For every 100 females, there were 90.6 males. For every 100 females age 18 and over, there were 86.2 males.

The median income for a household in the city in 2010 was $35,655, and the median income for a family was $46,228. Males had a median income of $35,538 versus $26,341 for females. The per capita income for the city was $20,549. About 8.9% of families and 11.4% of the population were below the poverty line, including 16.7% of those under age 18 and 7.1% of those age 65 or over.

=== 2000 census ===
As of the census of 2000, there were 45,793 people, 19,704 households, and 11,822 families residing in the city. Pittsfield is the largest city by population in Berkshire County, and ranks 27th out of the 351 cities and towns in Massachusetts. The population density was 1,124.3 inhabitants per square mile (434.1/km^{2}), making it the most densely populated community in Berkshire county and 92nd overall in the Commonwealth. There were 21,366 housing units at an average density of 524.6 per square mile (202.5/km^{2}).

== Government ==
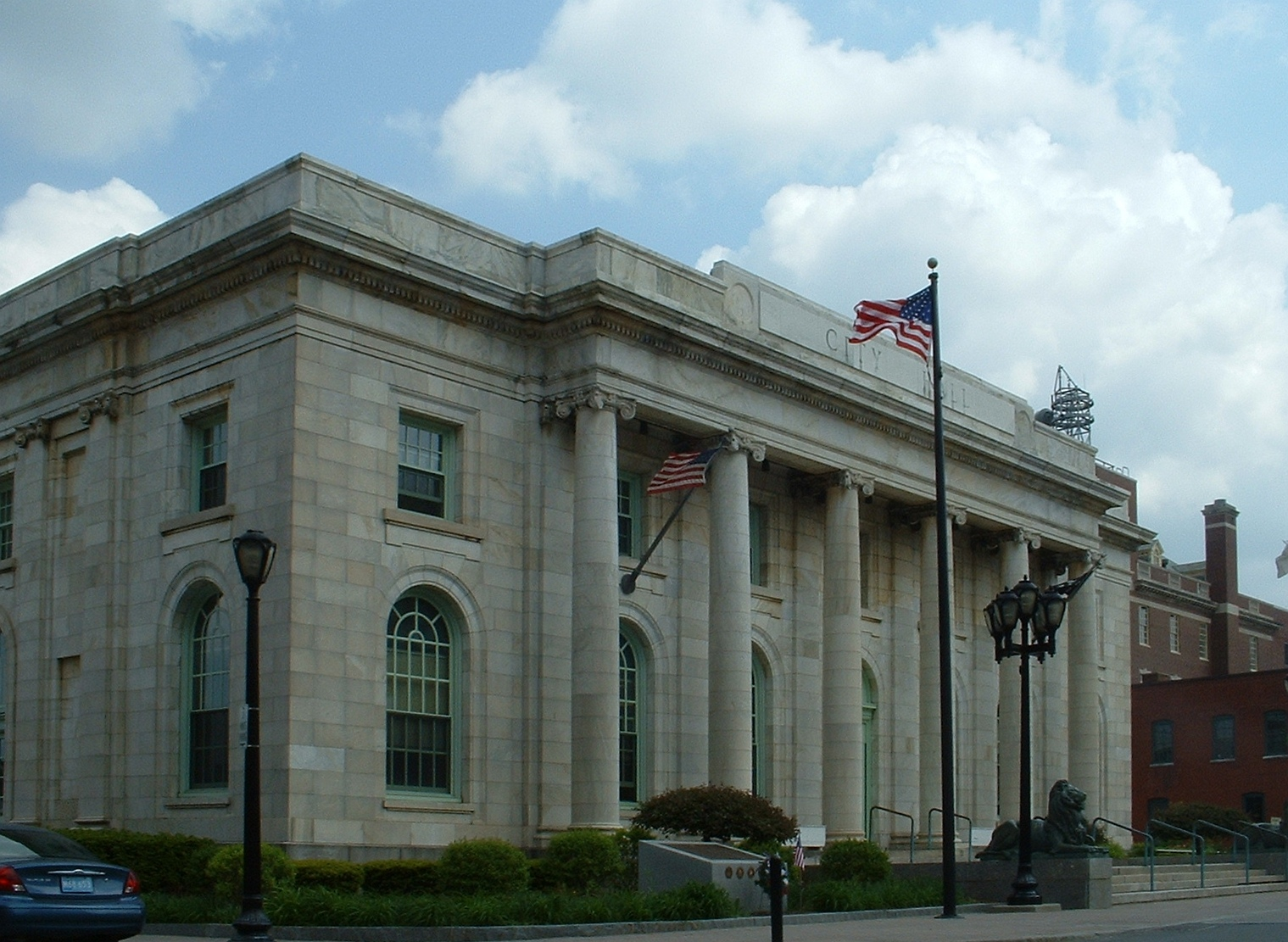
Pittsfield City Hall

Pittsfield employs the mayor-council form of government. The mayor is currently Peter Marchetti, who was elected to a four-year term in January 2024. The city is fully functioning, with all the major public services, including Berkshire Medical Center, the only hospital in the northern part of the county, and the region's only VA medical clinic. The city's library, the Berkshire Athenaeum, is one of the largest in western Massachusetts and is connected to the regional library system. Pittsfield is also the county seat of Berkshire County, and thus has many state facilities for the county. In 2011, the City of Pittsfield received 129 designs of prospective official flags from residents in honor of the 250th anniversary of Pittsfield's incorporation as a town, with the winning design submitted by Shaun Harris.

On the state level, Pittsfield has a single elected representative to the Massachusetts House of Representatives: the Second Berkshire District, which covers the entire city proper and is represented by Tricia Farley-Bouvier. In the Massachusetts Senate, the city is represented by Paul Mark of the Berkshire, Hampden, Franklin and Hampshire district. Tara Jacobs (D-North Adams) represents Pittsfield as part of the Eighth Massachusetts Governor's Council district. The city is patrolled by the Fourth (Cheshire) Station of Barracks "B" of the Massachusetts State Police.

On the national level, Pittsfield is represented in the United States House of Representatives as part of Massachusetts's 1st congressional district, and has been represented by Richard Neal (D) of Springfield since 2013. Massachusetts is represented in the United States Senate by senior Senator Elizabeth Warren (D) and junior Senator Ed Markey (D).

Pittsfield presidential election results
Year	Democratic	Republican	Third parties	Total Votes	Margin
2020	74.76% 16,404	22.86% 5,017	2.37% 521	21,942	51.90%
2016	68.84% 13,907	23.62% 4,771	7.54% 1,524	20,202	45.22%
2012	77.99% 15,648	20.22% 4,057	1.79% 360	20,065	57.77%
2008	76.11% 15,665	21.40% 4,404	2.49% 512	20,581	54.72%
2004	74.69% 15,269	24.41% 4,991	0.90% 184	20,444	50.27%
2000	67.71% 12,572	23.71% 4,402	8.58% 1,593	18,567	44.00%
1996	68.19% 13,451	19.62% 3,871	12.18% 2,403	19,725	48.57%
1992	57.22% 13,012	19.97% 4,541	22.82% 5,189	22,742	34.40%
1988	63.77% 13,780	35.55% 7,683	0.68% 147	21,610	28.21%
1984	50.16% 11,149	49.32% 10,963	0.53% 117	22,229	0.84%
1980	45.56% 11,127	37.48% 9,154	16.96% 4,141	24,422	8.08%
1976	59.07% 14,907	37.94% 9,575	3.00% 756	25,238	21.13%
1972	58.01% 14,504	41.24% 10,310	0.76% 189	25,003	16.77%
1968	64.02% 16,044	31.46% 7,885	4.51% 1,131	25,060	32.56%
1964	78.19% 19,753	21.14% 5,341	0.67% 168	25,262	57.05%
1960	63.79% 17,356	35.90% 9,768	0.31% 85	27,209	27.89%
1956	41.34% 10,972	58.06% 15,410	0.60% 159	26,541	16.72%
1952	46.26% 12,836	53.17% 14,752	0.57% 159	27,747	6.91%
1948	53.34% 12,558	43.82% 10,318	2.84% 669	23,545	9.51%
1944	58.29% 13,550	41.22% 9,581	0.49% 114	23,245	17.07%
1940	57.84% 13,350	41.68% 9,621	0.48% 111	23,082	16.16%

Voter registration and party enrollment as of February 1, 2025
Party	Number of voters	Percentage
Democratic	9,182	29.35%
Republican	2,047	6.54%
Unaffiliated	19,708	63.00%
Total	31,284	100%

== Education ==
Pittsfield operates a public school system, which has more than 6,000 students. There are eight elementary schools (Allendale, Robert T. Capeless, Crosby, Egremont, Morningside, Silvio O. Conte, Stearns and Williams), two middle schools (Theodore Herberg and John T. Reid), two high schools (Pittsfield High School and Taconic High School), and one private school (Miss Hall's School). The high schools both offer internal vocational programs. Students also come to the high schools from neighboring Richmond. There were two parochial schools open for many decades, but both recently closed (Saint Mark's for elementary and middle school students, and St. Joseph Central High School for high school students).

Pittsfield is the home to the main campus of Berkshire Community College and Mildred Elley's Pittsfield campus. The nearest state college is the Massachusetts College of Liberal Arts in North Adams, and the nearest state university is Westfield State University. The nearest private college is Williams College in Williamstown. In addition, the Berkshire Music School, a non-profit music school, offers private and group lessons in multiple instruments.

== Points of interest ==
=== Culture ===
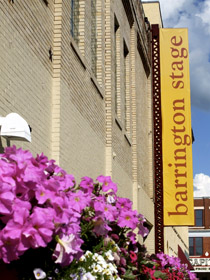
Downtown home of Barrington Stage Company

Pittsfield is the geographic and commercial hub of the Berkshires—a historic area that includes Tanglewood, the summer home of the Boston Symphony Orchestra, and author Edith Wharton's estate The Mount. Many buildings in Pittsfield are listed on the National Register of Historic Places.

Downtown Pittsfield is home to the gilded-age Colonial Theatre, the Berkshire Museum, the Beacon Cinema (multi-plex), the Barrington Stage Company, Berkshire Athenaeum, Wahconah Park, and Hebert Arboretum. In recent years, the city has undergone a transformation with significant investment in the historic downtown, including a variety of new restaurants (French, Asian, Latin American, etc.), condominium and other residential developments, and cultural attractions.

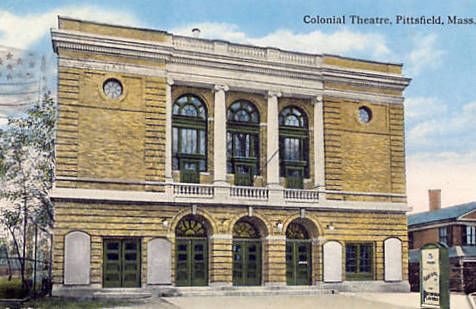
Colonial Theatre c. 1918

The Colonial Theatre, dating from 1903, was named by Hillary Clinton as a National Historic Treasure in 1998. The community invested more than $22 million to refurbish the 100-year-old Colonial Theatre, one of the only theaters of its kind from the Vaudeville age. The venue has been described as "one of the finest acoustical theaters in the world."

Barrington Stage Company, the Tony Award-winning producer of The 25th Annual Putnam County Spelling Bee invested millions into its newly renovated stage in downtown Pittsfield, along with the development of other stages within the downtown for smaller performances. Barrington Stage's head of its Musical Theatre Lab, William Finn, told the Boston Globe that he was determined to make Pittsfield the "epicenter of the musical theater universe."

Many of the Berkshires' oldest homes, dating to the mid-18th century, can be found in Pittsfield, as well as many historic neighborhoods dating from the late 19th century and early 20th century.

Zion Lutheran Church of PIttsfield is the oldest Lutheran church in New England.

Several small multigenerational farms can still be found in Pittsfield, but suburban sprawl and land development have recently claimed some of the land.

Additional cultural attractions include:

- Arrowhead, home of author Herman Melville (1850–1863). It was here that Melville wrote Moby Dick.
- Silvio O. Conte National Archives and Records Administration.

=== Recreation ===
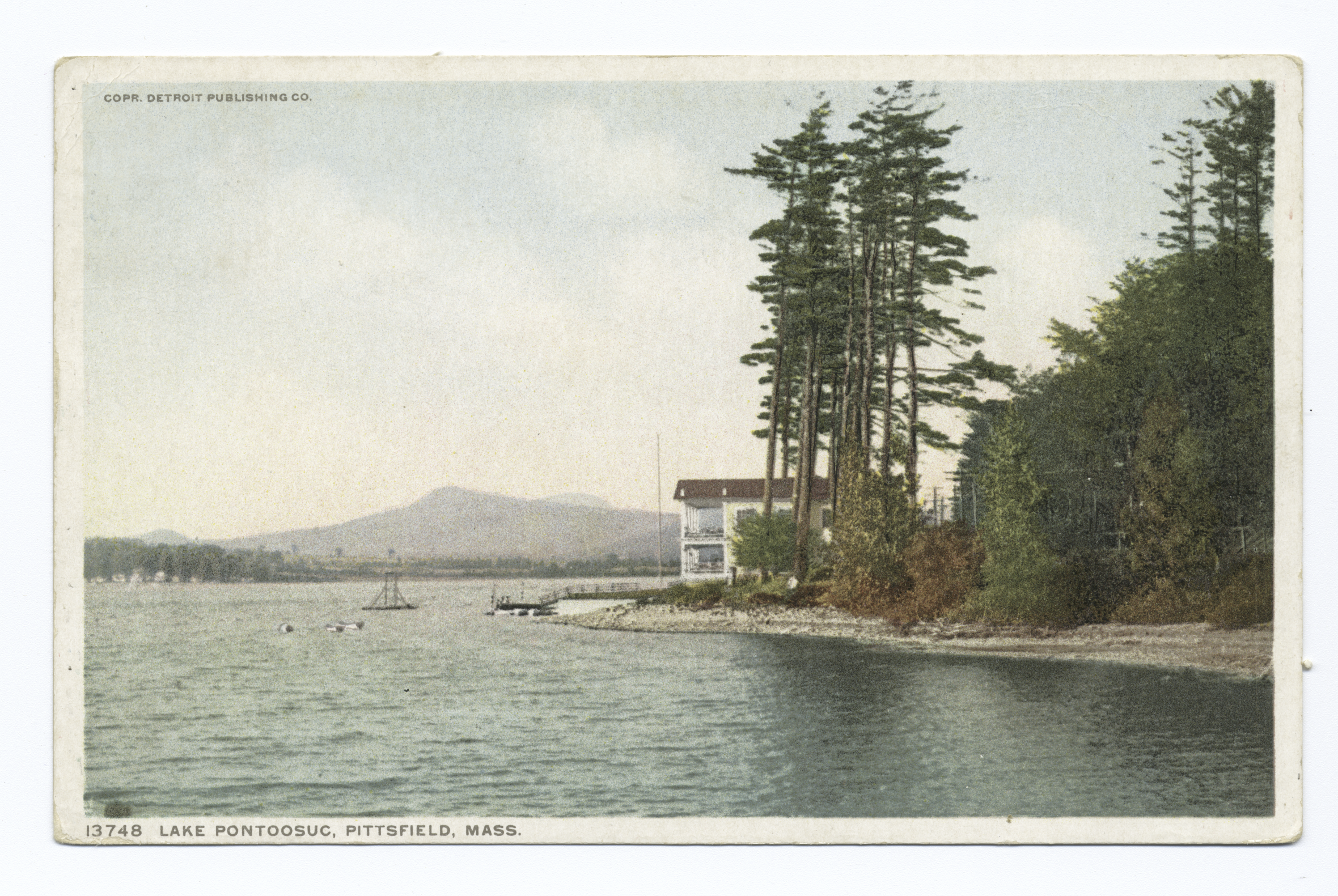
Lake Pontoosuc, early 20th century

Pittsfield has several country clubs, including the Pontoosuc Lake Country Club. Pittsfield is home to two major lakes, Onota and Pontoosuc, both used for swimming, boating, and fishing. The Berkshire Rowing and Sculling Society is on Onota Lake.

Pittsfield is home to Canoe Meadows Wildlife Sanctuary, 264 acres (107 ha) of woods, fields, and wetlands maintained by the Massachusetts Audubon Society. Bousquet Ski Area and Summer Resort entertains visitors and residents year-round with skiing, water slides, go-karts, and other fun activities.

Pittsfield State Forest, an 11,000-acre (4,500 ha) park, provides residents and tourists with hiking and cross-country skiing trails, camping, picnic areas, and a swimming beach. The highest body of water in Massachusetts, Berry Pond, is at the top of the Pittsfield State Forest just outside the city limits in the town of Hancock.

The Berkshire Bike Path Council is working with the City of Pittsfield and local residents to extend the Ashuwillticook Rail Trail, a 10.8-mile (17.4 km) paved trail just north of Pittsfield. The extension would pass through Pittsfield and lead south to Lenox and Great Barrington.

== Transportation ==
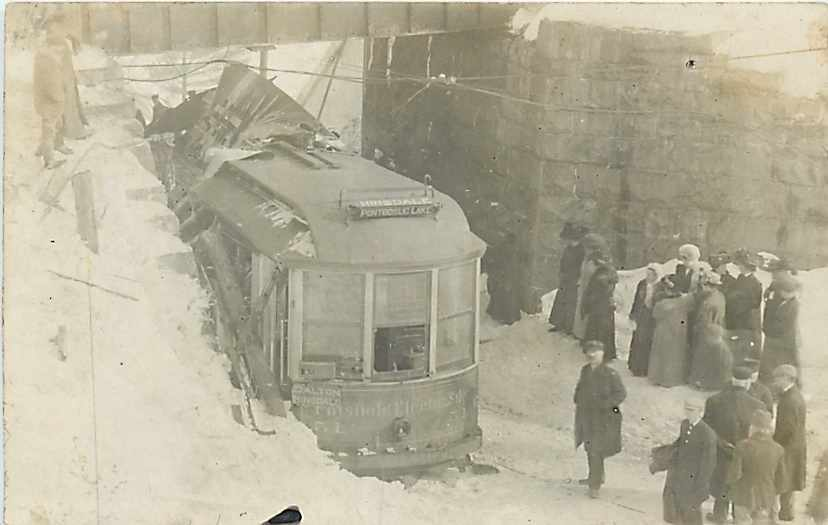
Pittsfield Trolley, early 20th century

Downtown Pittsfield serves as the crossroads of two US Highways: US 7 & US 20.

Pittsfield is served by Amtrak's Lake Shore Limited from Chicago to Boston, and seasonal Berkshire Flyer from New York City to Pittsfield, at the Joseph Scelsi Intermodal Transportation Center.

Local transit is provided by the Berkshire Regional Transit Authority.

== Media ==
=== Newspapers ===
- The Berkshire Eagle, the main daily newspaper for the Pittsfield area
- Hill Country Observer, a monthly newspaper covering an eight-county region of western Massachusetts, southern Vermont and eastern New York

=== Television ===
Pittsfield is in the Albany television market and is the community of license for two stations in that market, MyNetworkTV affiliate WNYA, and a low power TV station, W28DA, which rebroadcasts sister station and NBC affiliate WNYT on channel 13 from a location on South Mountain in the city. Springfield stations also serve the market with three stations (NBC affiliate WWLP, low-powered CBS affiliate WSHM-LD, and PBS member station WGBY-TV) on cable. WGGB-TV, Springfield's ABC affiliate, has never been carried on the cable system in Pittsfield, but is viewable over the air in some sections. Also carried on cable, but not necessarily serving Pittsfield, is Boston's WCVB (the ABC affiliate in that area).

Cable television subscribers of Charter Spectrum in Pittsfield receive public, educational, and government access (PEG) channels, provided by Pittsfield Community Television (PCTV), on channels 1301, 1302 and 1303:

- Access Pittsfield, channel 1301, Public-access television
- Pittsfield ETV, channel 1302, Education-access television
- Citylink, channel 1303, Government-access television (GATV)

Pittsfield Community Television is a not-for-profit, 501 (c)(3) organization and a member of the Alliance for Community Media. Programming on PCTV is available 24 hours per day, year-long, and is available online.

=== Radio ===
Pittsfield is home to the following radio stations:

- 1110 kHz WUPE (Oldies, simulcast of WUPE-FM)
- 1340 kHz WBRK (Adult Standards)
- 1420 kHz WBEC (Talk)
- 89.7 MHz WTBR-FM (Rock)
- 95.9 MHz WBEC-FM (Top 40, Tower on Bosquet Mountain)
- 101.7 MHz WBRK-FM (AC)
- 104.3 MHz WRRS-LP (Radio Reading Service)
- 106.1 MHz W291CH (Simulcast of WFCR, Western Massachusetts NPR affiliate out of Amherst)

Signals from North Adams, Great Barrington, and Springfield, Massachusetts, as well as from Albany, New York, also reach Pittsfield. In some areas signals from cities well outside of Pittsfield, like Boston and Hartford, Connecticut, will be received, depending on the location.

== Business ==
Pittsfield is home to several businesses, including:

- SABIC-Innovative Plastics (formerly known as General Electric (Plastics/Advanced Materials Division) and now a subsidiary of the Riyadh-based Saudi Basic Industries Corporation)
- General Dynamics Mission Systems (Pittsfield facility originally known as General Electric Ordnance)
- Interprint Incorporated on the Pittsfield-Richmond line
- The Moscow Ballet, national touring dance company and producer of the Great Russian Nutcracker
- Pittsfield Generating Facility, natural gas fired generating station
- The Berkshire Humane Society operates animal welfare services and pet adoption facilities in Pittsfield

== Notable people ==
- Thomas Allen, railroad builder and member of United States Congress
- William Allen, compiler of first work of general biography published in United States
- Edward Deming and Faith Andrews, historians, authors, and authorities on the Shakers
- Elizabeth Banks, actress in films including Seabiscuit, Spider-Man, The 40-Year-Old Virgin, W., The Hunger Games and The Lego Movie; and current host of Press Your Luck
- William Francis Bartlett, Civil War general
- Mark Belanger, former Gold Glove shortstop for Baltimore Orioles, 1970 World Series champion
- Matt Belknap, founder of Aspecialthing Records comedy label, producer and co-host of comedy podcast Never Not Funny
- Chuck Berkeley, 2010 Olympian in bobsled
- Michael Boroniec, sculptor and painter
- Lawrence Bossidy, former CEO of Honeywell
- Henry Shaw Briggs, brigadier general during American Civil War
- Roger E. Broggie, Disney Legend Award recipient (1990), selected by Walt Disney as first Imagineer, team that created Disneyland, Walt Disney World and similar themed amusement parks
- Colonel John Brown, Revolutionary War patriot, first to accuse Benedict Arnold
- Timothy Childs, congressman
- Silvio O. Conte, congressman
- Elizabeth Sprague Coolidge, philanthropist and music patron, founded Berkshire Music Festival at South Mountain in 1918
- Art Ditmar, 1950s pitcher for Philadelphia and Kansas City Athletics and New York Yankees
- Michael Downing (writer) author of book Breakfast with Scot
- J. Allan Dunn, prolific author for pulp magazines
- Pat Fallon, member of the U.S. House, former member of the Texas Senate and Texas House of Representatives
- Cy Ferry, baseball player for Detroit Tigers and Cleveland Naps in early years of American League
- Jack Ferry, baseball player for Pittsburgh Pirates in the 1910s
- Marshall Field, founded Chicago's Marshall Field's department stores, took first job in 1853 as a clerk in Pittsfield; white terra-cotta Pittsfield Building in downtown Chicago is so named because of Field's connection to Pittsfield
- Daniel Fox, shares credit for invention of Lexan plastic
- Peter Francese, speaker and writer
- Marc Gafni, American author and former rabbi, New Age spiritual teacher
- Elaine Giftos, actress
- Frank Grant, 19th Century African American baseball player
- Nancy Graves, sculptor and painter
- Tom Grieve, player, general manager and broadcaster for Major League Baseball's Texas Rangers
- Gene Hermanski, baseball player, Brooklyn Dodgers, Chicago Cubs, Pittsburgh Pirates
- Oliver Wendell Holmes Sr., poet, summered in Pittsfield; mother's family owned 26,000 acres (11,000 ha) in Pittsfield
- Hung Huynh, winner of reality television show Top Chef Season 3, graduate of Pittsfield High School
- Donald Kaufman, co-founder of KB Toys and antique toy collector
- Benjamin Larned (1794–1862), colonel and Paymaster-General of the United States Army
- Henry Wadsworth Longfellow, poet, educator, linguist, owned home on East Street, now site of Pittsfield High School (see photos above)
- Jay McInerney, novelist, author of Bright Lights, Big City (1984) on which film was based
- James Melcher (1939–2023), Olympic fencer and hedge fund manager
- Herman Melville, author, resided at Arrowhead in Pittsfield, where he wrote his most famous novel, Moby-Dick and several others.
- William Miller, 19th Century preacher
- Sarah Morewood, literary figure in the Berkshires and intimate friend of Herman Melville. Her farm adjoined Arrowhead (Herman Melville House), and is now the site of the Country Club of Pittsfield
- Elaine Cancilla Orbach, Broadway actress, actor Jerry Orbach's widow
- Chad Paronto, Major League Baseball relief pitcher
- Edward Partridge, first bishop of the Church of Jesus Christ of Latter-day Saints
- Adrian Pasdar, actor
- Brian Piccolo, Chicago Bears halfback, subject of movie Brian's Song
- Robert Prentiss, Massachusetts and New York politician
- Emily Robison, musician and member of the Dixie Chicks
- John James Rudin, Roman Catholic bishop
- Richard Salwitz, musician with J Geils Band
- Niraj Shah (born 1973/74), billionaire CEO and co-founder of Wayfair
- William Stanley Jr., invented first alternating current electrical transformer
- Charles Thomas Stearns, member of Minnesota Territorial Legislature
- Howie Storie, catcher for Boston Red Sox during early 1930s
- John Szarkowski, photographer, critic, historian, curator of photography at MoMA
- James Walter Thompson, 19th Century advertising pioneer
- Bruce Tulgan, author of Managing Generation X and It's Okay To Be the Boss
- Elkanah Watson, author and agriculturist, in 1810 held the first county fair in the country in Pittsfield
- Jack Welch, former CEO of General Electric
- Turk Wendell, MLB Pitcher
- Paul Weston, musician, composer and arranger, was raised in Pittsfield.
- Charles Brewster Wheeler, U.S. Army brigadier general
- David Dunnels White, soldier of 37th Massachusetts Regiment, organized in Pittsfield during Civil War, captured Confederate Major General George Washington Custis Lee, son of famed General Robert E. Lee, during Battle of Sailor's Creek Virginia, April 6, 1865
- Charles White Whittlesey, Army officer and Medal of Honor recipient who led "Lost Battalion" in Meuse-Argonne Offensive in October 1918 during final stages of World War I
- Margaret Hicks Williams, government official, writer, political expert
- Robin Williams, actor, maintained a summer home in Pittsfield
- Stephanie Wilson, astronaut
- Walter Zink, was a professional baseball pitcher who played for the New York Giants

== See also ==
- List of mayors of Pittsfield, Massachusetts
- List of mill towns in Massachusetts
- Pittsfield phylactery
