= David McFadden =

David McFadden may refer to:

- David McFadden (poet) (1940–2018), Canadian poet, novelist and travel writer
- David Henry McFadden (1856–1935), Manitoba politician
- David James McFadden (born 1945), Ontario lawyer, former politician
- David Revere McFadden, American museum curator
- David McFadden (reporter), Associated Press reporter based in Kingston, Jamaica

== See also ==
- David McFadzean, American TV producer
