= Interprint =

German Decor printing company

INTERPRINT Group
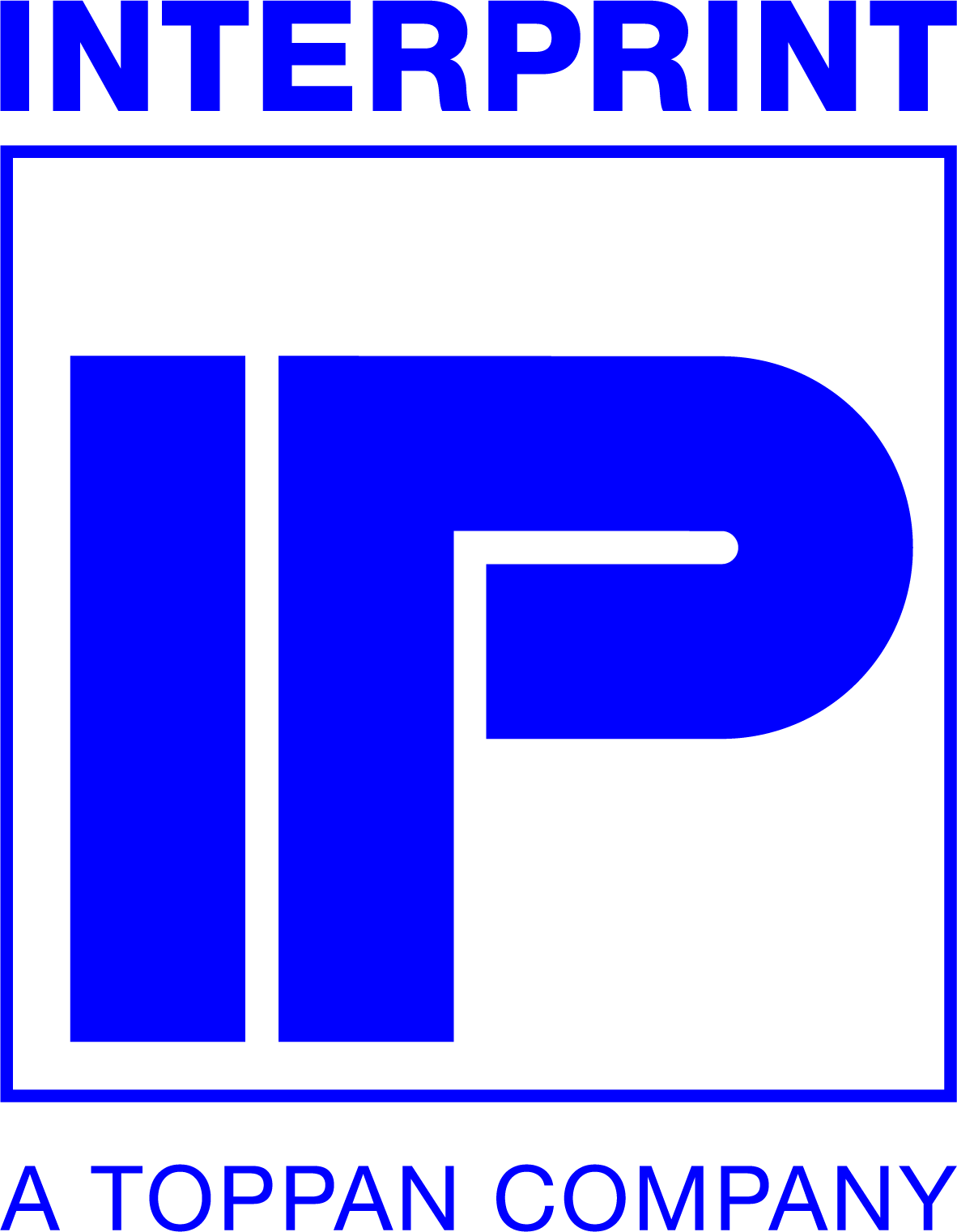
- Company type: Limited liability company (GmbH)
- Industry: Decor printing / Furniture supply industry
- Founded: 1969; 57 years ago
- Headquarters: Arnsberg, Germany
- Area served: Worldwide
- Key people: Jens Bauer (CEO), Jens Friedhoff (CFO), Martijn Huisman (CMO), Stephan Igel (CSO), Kaneyuki Iseda (CGO)
- Products: Decor Paper, Digital Printing, Melamine Film, XELIO finish foil, MODUS thermoplastic film
- Revenue: 410 Mio. EUR (2024)
- Number of employees: approx. 1,600 worldwide (2025)
- Parent: Toppan
- Website: interprint.com

Interprint is a German decor printing company. The company decorates the surfaces of numerous materials in the segment of derived timber products, including living room, kitchen and bathroom furniture, laminate flooring and for interior furnishing in trains, ships or in the recreational vehicle industry.

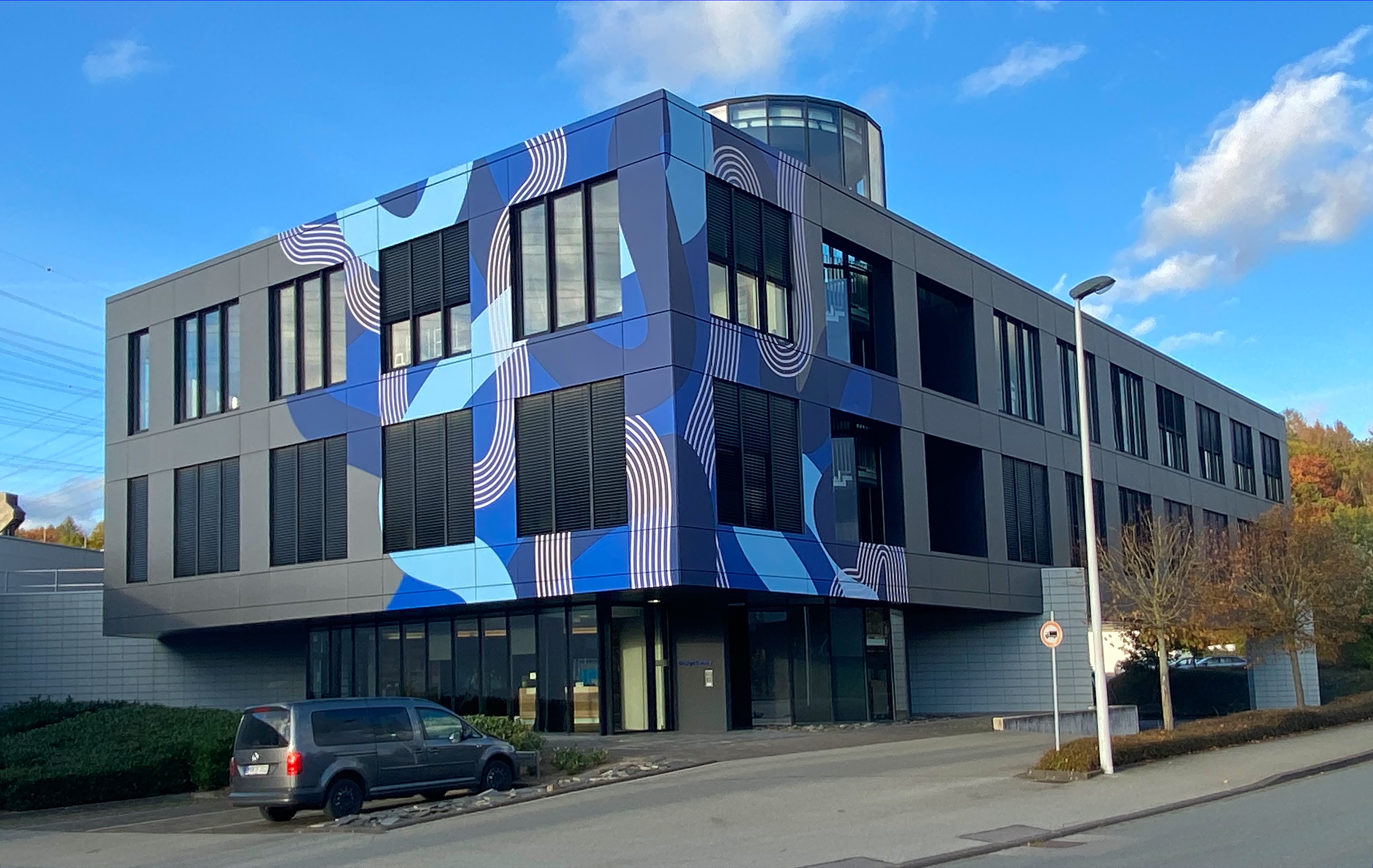
INTERPRINT Design Centre in Arnsberg, Germany

As of 2025, Interprint had 37 production presses with a total capacity of 2.1 billion square metres at 9 production sites in Germany, the United States, Poland, Malaysia, China, Russia, Brazil and Spain and had approximately 1,600 employees worldwide. It is headquartered in Arnsberg, North Rhine-Westphalia / Germany.

Since 2019, Interprint has been fully owned by Japanese company Toppan Group after it acquired the company from Wrede Industrieholding.

== History ==
Interprint was founded by Paul Wrede in 1969. In 1983 Interprint establishes its first subsidiary in the United States, with Interprint becoming the number one for decor printing in North America. In 1990 the company opened a sales office in Moscow, Russia.

In 1995 Interprint goes beyond its continental frontiers for the second time, opening a new production plant in Malaysia to cater for the Asian region. In 1997 it navigates its way over the Alps to Italy, where it opens its sales office Interprint Italia S.r.l. In 1998 Interprint set a new standards in the Eastern European markets thanks to its new production plant in Poland. In 2001 Interprint opened a sales office in Shanghai, China and in 2003 it opened a production plant in Changzhou, China.

In 2006, Interprint celebrated the opening of its engraving and design centre in Arnsberg, Germany, and a new production plant in Pittsfield, Massachusetts, USA. During the 2008 financial crisis, the company invested in a new production plant in Egorievsk, Russia. In 2010, Interprint became active in Spain and Turkey, with new sales offices opening in Madrid and Istanbul respectively. Interprint also acquires all shares in OOO Coveright RUS in Samara/Russia. The new location for the production of melamine films would do business under the name 'OOO Interprint Samara'.

In 2014, Interprint expanded its international team by building a new production plant in Curitiba, Brazil, and a sales office in Pretoria, South Africa. In 2015, Interprint entered a new worlds in decor printing with the first industrial digital printing machine worldwide.

In 2019, Interprint was acquired and become part of the Japanese Toppan company.

== Locations ==
The company has production and Sales Offices in:

- Germany - Arnsberg
- Brazil - Curitiba
- China - Changzhou, Shanghai
- India - Mumbai
- Italy - Affi
- Malaysia - Nilai
- Poland - Ozorków
- Russia - Egorievsk, Samara
- Spain - Tordera
- South Africa - Pretoria
- Turkey - Istanbul
- USA - Pittsfield

Interprint is also represented by agencies worldwide.

== Products ==
Wood, stone and creative decors from Interprint decorate the surfaces of furniture and flooring and derived timber products used for interior design. In these areas, Interprint offers their customers a large range of materials for their processing. These include decorative paper, finish foils, melamine films, water-resistant films and other product innovations – produced with gravure printing or industrial digital printing.

After all, the finish determines the look of a piece of furniture and is thus an important aspect of the purchasing decision.
