= Zion Lutheran Church of Pittsfield =

Church in Massachusetts

Zion Lutheran Church
- Zion Lutheran Church of Pittsfield
- Zion Lutheran Church
- 42.4505°N 73.2502°W
- Location: 74 First St; Pittsfield, MA 01201
- Country: United States
- Denomination: Evangelical Lutheran Church of America
- Website: https://zionlutheranpittsfield.org/

History
- Former name(s): German Evangelical Church & Society of Pittsfield
- Founded: 1859
- Founder: German immigrants

Administration
- Division: New England Synod Region 7B

Clergy
- Pastor: Joel O. Bergeland

Zion Lutheran Church is the oldest Lutheran congregation in New England. A historic church in downtown Pittsfield, Massachusetts next to the city's central Common, it was built on land donated by the city of Pittsfield in 1859.

== Architecture and building history ==
The church was originally built as a white wooden building, but was replaced by a brick building in 1892. An addition was added in 1960. A $1.2 million renovation was completed in 2017 which removed a portion of the 1960 addition deemed energy inefficient and too costly to maintain and added a handicap accessible entrance. Among other changes, in 2017 the church replaced fixed pews in the sanctuary with removable chairs which would allow the space, now called The Common Room, to be more flexible for use by community groups during the week.

In 2025, using privately raised funds as well as American Rescue Plan Act funds from the city of Pittsfield, the building was renovated and expanded again in partnership local housing nonprofit Hearthway. The renovation converted old Sunday school classrooms and additional space into nine permanent supportive apartments and a day shelter and resource center called The First where ServiceNet offers case management, mental health, and human services support.

== Community Involvement ==
Being so close to the Pittsfield Common, the church often offers its space for use by the community for non-church functions. For example, it hosts monthly indoor season farmer's markets and was a partner that provided space and support to Pittsfield's Shakespeare in the Park (2014–2022). Zion is also been the practicing location for Berkshire Children's Chorus and has hosted practice of the Stockbridge Sinfonia since 2012.

== Ministers ==
- 2021 - Rev. Joel O. Bergeland
- 2020 - 2013 Rev. Timothy Weisman
- Rev. Peter Boehringer
