= Berkshire Athenaeum =

Library in Pittsfield, Massachusetts, United States

Coordinates: 42.4476°N 73.2514°W

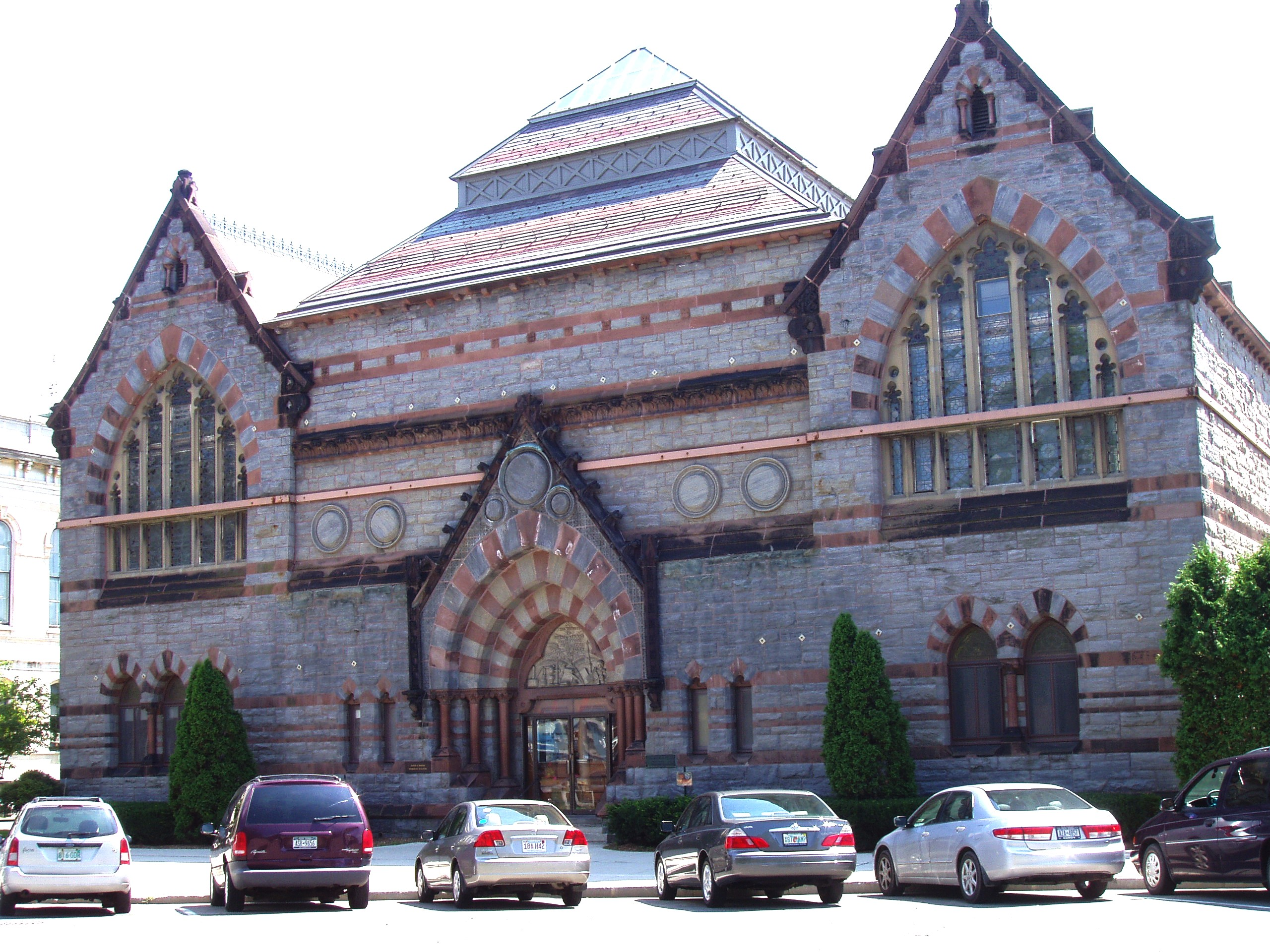
Berkshire Athenaeum, 1876 building

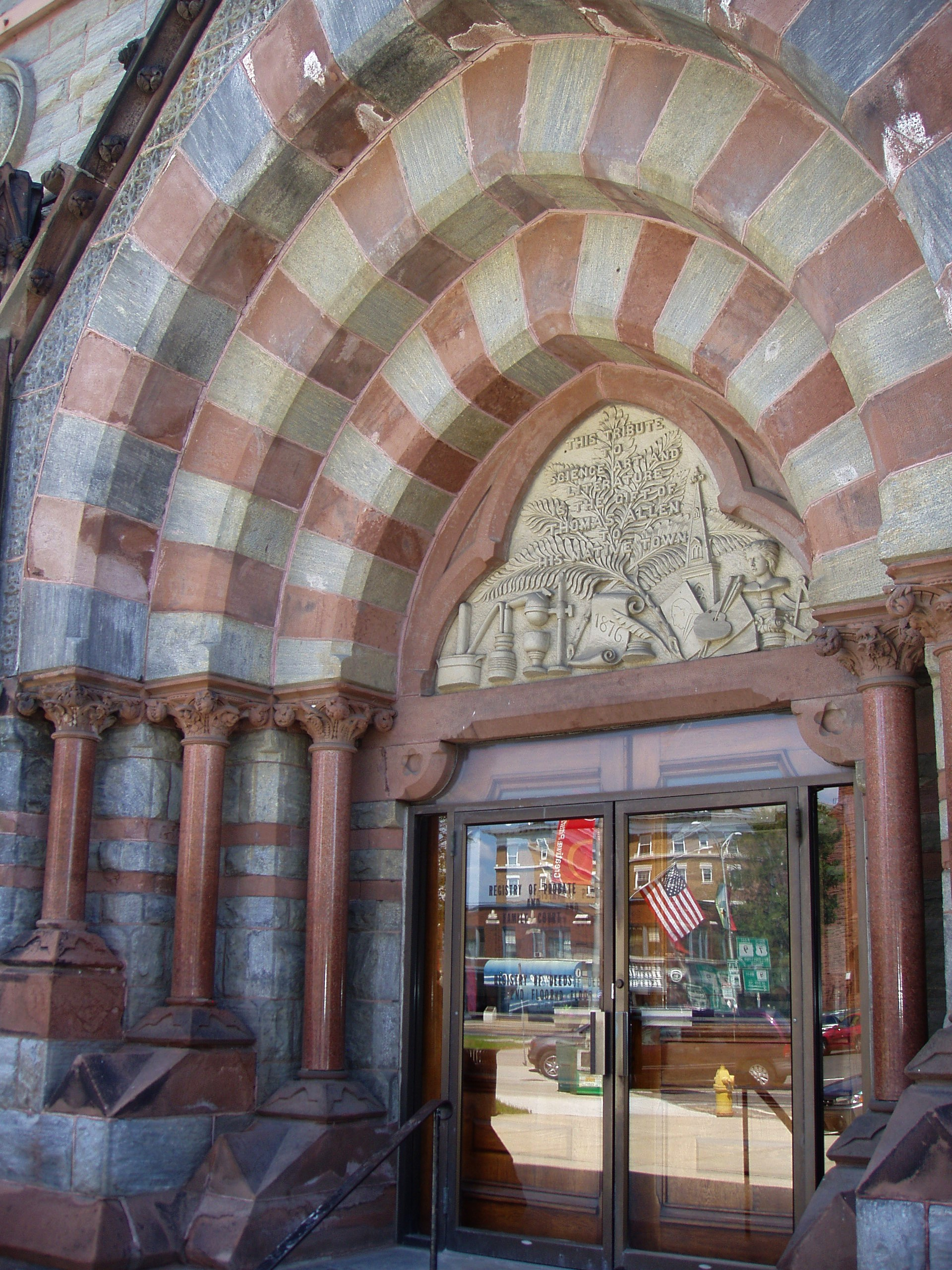
Berkshire Athenaeum, entry to 1876 building

The original Berkshire Athenaeum, now known as the Bowes Building, is a nineteenth-century building that still stands on Park Square in Pittsfield, Massachusetts in the Berkshires. Like many New England libraries, the Berkshire Athenaeum started as a private organization. The private Public Library Association was founded in 1850. The group's name was later changed to the Berkshire Athenæum. Later still, Thomas F. Plunkett, Calvin Martin and Thomas Allen, were "instrumental in forming it into a free library".

The Berkshire Athenaeum is now also known as the Pittsfield Public Library at 1 Wendell Avenue in Pittsfield, containing a collection of more than 150,000 items. The library's special collections on local history, genealogy, author Herman Melville and other local authors are some of the best in the northeast.

== History of the nineteenth century edifice ==
1874 - Construction begins:

"In 1874, by means of a bequest from Phineas Allen, and the gift of [the 1876] building from Thomas Allen, the Berkshire Athenaeum was placed upon a firm foundation." Thomas Allen joined a group of investors in purchasing the land in 1868 on Park Square for an eventual library building. Within five years, Allen made known his willingness to donate $50,000 for the construction of the new library. His uncle, Phineas Allen, bequeathed in his will another $50,000 for the library which did not become available until the construction of the new addition, completed in 1897.

1876 - September 23: Dedication of the new library

1903 - The Berkshire Athenaeum assumes responsibility for the newly created Berkshire Museum, housing the public library and museum until 1932 when the museum is spun off.

1964 - Pittsfield Historical Commission formed

1975 - The Pittsfield Public Library moves to its current location

1976 - State of Massachusetts takes ownership, a critical step in saving the building

1980 - The original 1876 building opens after renovations and houses the Berkshire County Probate & Family Courts and the Middle District Registry of Deeds. It was renamed the Bowes Building in honor of James Bowes, the County Commissioner who had been instrumental in trying to save the building. Bowes died in May 1980.

2014 - $4.3 million eighteen-month preservation project, "Life, Safety, Exterior & Accessibility Improvement," to stabilize bulging masonry on front façade

- Architect: William Gillen, Ford-Gillen Architects
- Contractor: Mike Mucci, Allegrone Masonry

== Design ==
Designed by New York architect William Appleton Potter, the original Berkshire Athenaeum building was erected in 1874-1876 as a gift from railway magnate and native son Thomas Allen. It is in the High Victorian Gothic style, constructed of dark blue limestone from Great Barrington, red freestone from Longmeadow and red granite from Missouri.

== Special collections in the Wendell Avenue Berkshire Athenaeum ==
=== Local history collection ===
The collection is geared to those with historical interest in the City of Pittsfield and its residents. With close to 4,700 square feet, the department is located at the east end of the main floor of the Athenaeum, with additional closed stack space located in the storage room on the lower floor.

The local history collection provides historical and genealogical information primarily about the Berkshires and greater Berkshire area, but it also includes New England, eastern New York state, and southern Canada to showcase the origin of Berkshire families.

=== Local history department ===
It is a storage room located on the basement level and has 1,800 linear feet of shelf space housing an overflow collection of historical materials less in demand by the public, or replacement copies of highly used materials. This area is not accessible to the public. Genealogy resources include 71,000 reels of film, books, and finding aids, which were formerly held by the National Archives and Records Administration (NARA) Pittsfield facility. All researchers must fill a request form to gain on-site access.

=== Berkshire Authors Room ===
The Berkshire Authors Room houses a collection of books and other materials by and about authors with a connection to the Berkshires.

=== Herman Melville Memorial Room ===
The Herman Melville Memorial Room collection includes first editions of writer Herman Melville's works, manuscripts, family letters, and annotated volumes from his personal library. Paintings. prints, and photographs of him are also available. In addition, the collection showcases biographies and critical studies works produced by Melville scholars.

The Herman Melville Memorial Room was mainly planned and funded by Dr. Henry Murray of Harvard University. Melville’s relatives have donated other primary sources, such as his books and memorabilia.
