= Pittsfield phylactery =

Tefillin found in Pittfield, Massachusetts

The Pittsfield phylactery or Pittsfield tefillin is a tefillin with a black leather strap. It was discovered in Pittsfield, Massachusetts on the property of Joseph Merrick in 1815. The item was used as evidence by proponents of the erroneus theory that Native Americans were descended from the lost Tribes of Israel; in reality, the tefillin more likely originated from War of 1812 prisoners on the land several years prior.

The tefillin is currently held by the Peabody Museum at Harvard University.

== Description ==
The tefillin measures 2.5 x 6.2 cm (1 x 2 7/16 in.). It contains three scrolls, containing the verses Exodus 13, 11-16, Deuteronomy 6, 4-9, and Deuteronomy 11, 13-21.

== Origins and provenance ==
The phylactery was found on Merrick's property in June 1815, amidst debris left by plowing. When Merrick later cut it open, he found "several tightly scrolled pieces of parchment inscribed with Hebrew characters" inside.

It was donated to the American Antiquarian Society in 1816. Although misplaced by 1823, the item later resurfaced. The society gifted the tefillin to Harvard University's Peabody Museum of Archaeology and Ethnology in 1895.

== Analysis and interpretation ==
In 1985, historian William H. Goetzmann wrote that "the Pittsfield phylactery caught the attention of nearly every major nineteenth-century proponent of the Lost Tribes theory before it mysteriously disappeared.

A local Congregational minister, William Allen, was asked by Presbyterian minister Sylvester Larned to interpret the four pieces. Larned interpreted them as being Hebrew versions of parts of Deuteronomy and Exodus, with their theorized old age backing the "Lost Tribes" argument. Allen suggested that as it was found in an area 'in which chips and dirt had accumulated for years' and was in good condition, a more likely explanation was that it had been dropped by one of the Hessian or British prisoners Merrick employed during the War of 1812.

Larned, disagreeing with Allen's hypothesis, sent it to the American Antiquarian Society, specifically to Elias Boudinot. It was not mentioned in Boudinot's 1816 book A Star in the West, A Humble Attempt to Discover the Long Lost Ten Tribes of Israel; Preparatory to Their Return to Their Beloved City, Jerusalem.

The Vermont clergyman Ethan Smith, who learned of the phylactery, interviewed Merrick and wrote an account of its discovery which was similar to Allen's. He then spoke to a Dr. West in nearby Stockbridge and who told him that 'an old Indian informed him that his fathers in this country, had, not long since, been in the possession of a book which they had, for a long time, carried with them, but having lost the knowledge of reading it, they buried it with an Indian Chief.' Smith believed that 'these passages . . . were found in the strap of rawhide; which unquestionably had been written on the very pieces of parchment now in the possession of the Antiquarian Society, before Israel left the land of Syria, 25000 years ago.' In 1823 Smith, wrote View of the Hebrews which argues that Native Americans were in fact the Ten Lost Tribes of Israel.

Lee M. Friedman wrote about it in 1917, saying there was no conclusive evidence supporting a Jewish presence in Pittsfield in 1815 or earlier, but that this did not definitively prove Jews had not lived in or travelled through the area.

Discussion of the artifact was part of a 2011 historical reenactment in the area.

=== Possible influence on Joseph Smith ===
Fawn M. Brodie, the first major historian to write a non-hagiographic biography of Joseph Smith, proposed that Joseph Smith's theory of the Hebraic origin of the American Indians came "chiefly" from View of the Hebrews. "It may never be proved that Joseph saw View of the Hebrews before writing the Book of Mormon," wrote Brodie in 1945, "but the striking parallelisms between the two books hardly leave a case for mere coincidence."

Goetzmann thought it likely, if not certain, that a young Joseph Smith heard of the phylactery, concluding that "If the Pittsfield discovery was not a direct source of the Mormon legend, at the very least it contributed to the contemporary mythology that caused other writers to concoct tales about ancient historical manuscripts found in America."
