= Elaine Cancilla Orbach =

American actress and dancer

- Born: Elaine Cancilla; January 19, 1940; Pittsfield, Massachusetts, U.S.
- Died: April 1, 2009 (aged 69); New York City, New York, U.S.
- Occupations: Actress, dancer
- Years active: 1959–2000s
- Spouse: Jerry Orbach (m. 1979; died 2004)

Elaine Cancilla Orbach (January 19, 1940 – April 1, 2009) was an American stage and musical theatre actress and dancer.

== Career ==
Orbach, known professionally as Elaine Cancilla, appeared on Broadway and Off Broadway in productions including: Fiorello!, How to Succeed in Business Without Really Trying, Here's Love, Flora the Red Menace, Sweet Charity and Cry for Us All.

== Private life ==
In 1979 she married actor Jerry Orbach, a star on stage and later of film and television (Law & Order). They met several years earlier while appearing together in the original Broadway theatre production of the Kander & Ebb musical, Chicago. They also co-starred in a touring production of Neil Simon's play, Chapter Two.

The couple lived in a high-rise on 53rd Street off Eighth Avenue in Hell's Kitchen, an intersection shared with the Theater District, where Orbach was a fixture in that neighborhood's restaurants and shops. His glossy publicity photo hangs in Ms. Buffy's French Cleaners, and he was a regular at some of the Italian restaurants nearby. Following his death in 2004, she petitioned to have a portion of 53rd and 8th renamed in honor of Orbach; the plans met with some resistance by local planning boards, but were overcome thanks to his popularity and his love of the Big Apple.

== Death ==
She died on April 1, 2009, at age 69, from pneumonia in a hospital in New York City. She was survived by her stepsons Tony Orbach and Chris Orbach, from whom she was estranged due to disagreements over Jerry's will.
