= David Revere McFadden =

David Revere McFadden was Chief Curator and Vice President for Programs and Collections at the Museum of Arts & Design in New York City from 1997 until his retirement in 2013.

== Education ==
McFadden did his undergraduate and graduate work at the University of Minnesota, and received his graduate degree in the History of Art (Renaissance and Baroque Studies), with a secondary major in Chinese history.
