= Jerry Orbach =

American actor and singer (1935–2004)

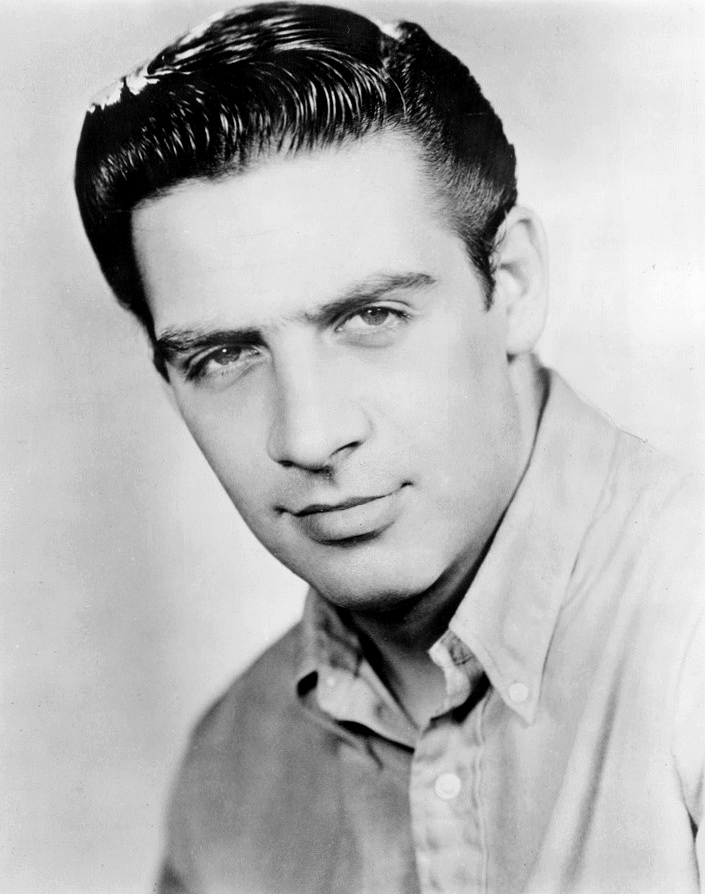
- Orbach in 1965
- Born: Jerome Bernard Orbach; October 20, 1935; New York City, U.S.
- Died: December 28, 2004 (aged 69); New York City, U.S.
- Resting place: Trinity Church Cemetery and Mausoleum, Manhattan
- Occupations: Actor; singer
- Years active: 1955–2004
- Spouses: Marta Curro (m. 1958; div. 1975); Elaine Cancilla (m. 1979)
- Children: 2

Jerome Bernard Orbach (October 20, 1935 – December 28, 2004) was an American actor and singer described as "one of the last bona fide leading men of the Broadway musical."

Orbach's career began on the New York stage, both on and off-Broadway. He created roles such as El Gallo in the original off-Broadway run of The Fantasticks (1960), in which he was the first performer to sing that show's standard "Try to Remember". Orbach won the Tony Award for Best Actor in a Musical for playing Chuck Baxter in Promises, Promises (1968–1972). He was also Tony-nominated for portraying Sky Masterson in Guys and Dolls (1965) and Billy Flynn in the original Chicago (1976).

Orbach gained worldwide fame for starring as NYPD Detective Lennie Briscoe on the NBC legal drama Law & Order from 1992 to 2004. For that role, he earned the Screen Actors Guild Award for Outstanding Actor in a Drama Series as well as a nomination for the Primetime Emmy Award for Outstanding Lead Actor in a Drama Series. He reprised the role across several series, including Homicide: Life on the Street (1996–1999), Law & Order: Special Victims Unit (1999–2000), Law & Order: Criminal Intent (2001), and Law & Order: Trial by Jury (2005).

On film, Orbach took supporting roles as a detective in the crime drama Prince of the City (1981), a coach in the comedy film Brewster's Millions (1985), an overly protective father in the romance film Dirty Dancing (1987), and a mobster in the drama Crimes and Misdemeanors (1989). He voiced Lumière in the Walt Disney animated musical film Beauty and the Beast (1991).

== Early life ==
Orbach was born on October 20, 1935, in the Bronx, the only child of Emily Orbach (née Olexy), a greeting card manufacturer and radio singer, and Leon Orbach, a restaurant manager and vaudeville performer. His father was a Jewish immigrant from Hamburg, Germany. Orbach said his father was descended from Sephardic Jewish refugees from the Spanish Inquisition. His mother, a native of Luzerne County, Pennsylvania, was a Catholic of Polish-Lithuanian descent. Orbach was raised in his mother's Catholic faith.

The Orbach family moved frequently during his childhood, living in Mount Vernon, New York; Wilkes-Barre, Nanticoke, and Scranton, Pennsylvania; Springfield, Massachusetts; and Waukegan, Illinois. Orbach attended Waukegan Township High School and graduated in 1952, having skipped two grades in elementary school due to his high IQ of 163. He played on the football team and began learning acting in a speech class.

The summer after graduating from high school, Orbach worked at the theatre of Chevy Chase Country Club of Wheeling, Illinois, and enrolled at the University of Illinois Urbana-Champaign in the fall. In 1953, Orbach returned to the Chicago area and enrolled at Northwestern University. Orbach left Northwestern before his senior year and moved to New York City in 1955 to pursue acting and to study at the Actors Studio, where one of his instructors was the studio's founder, Lee Strasberg.

== Career ==
=== 1960–1979: Broadway debut and theatre roles ===
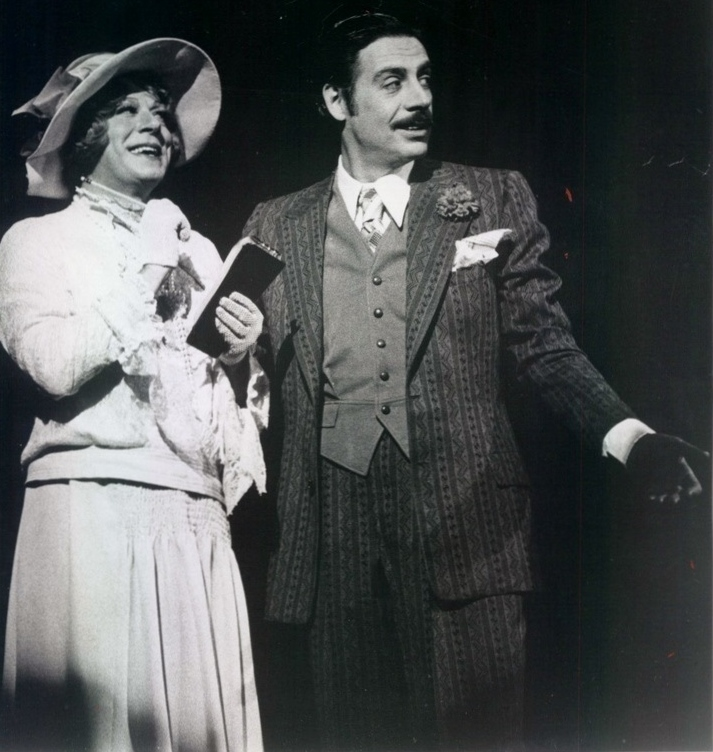
Orbach as Billy Flynn in the original 1975 Broadway production of Chicago, with M. O'Haughey as Mary Sunshine

Orbach became an accomplished Broadway and off-Broadway actor. His first major role was El Gallo in the original 1960 off-Broadway cast of the eventual decades-running hit The Fantasticks, making Orbach the first to perform the show's signature song and pop standard, "Try To Remember". Other notable starring roles included: The Threepenny Opera; his Broadway debut in Carnival!, the musical version of the movie Lili; a revival of Annie Get Your Gun; and a revival of Guys and Dolls, as Sky Masterson, for which he received a Tony Award nomination for Best Featured Actor in a Musical.

He acted in the original productions of Chicago as Billy Flynn, receiving another Tony Award nomination, 42nd Street, and a revival of The Cradle Will Rock. Orbach made occasional film and TV appearances into the 1970s and appeared as a celebrity panelist on both What's My Line? and Super Password.

Orbach won the Tony Award for Best Actor in a Musical for playing Chuck Baxter in Promises, Promises (1968–1972).

=== 1980–1991: Film roles and Beauty and the Beast ===
In the 1980s, Orbach shifted to film and TV work full-time. Prominent roles included tough, corrupt NYPD narcotics detective Gus Levy in Sidney Lumet's Prince of the City (1981); he was the 1981 runner-up for the NSFC Best Supporting Actor award. He also portrayed gangsters in the action thriller F/X (1986) and in the Woody Allen drama Crimes and Misdemeanors (1989), which also featured his future Law & Order co-star Sam Waterston.

In 1985, Orbach played a coach in the comedy film Brewster's Millions, and became a regular guest star on Murder, She Wrote as private detective Harry McGraw, which led to him starring in the short-lived spin-off series The Law & Harry McGraw. In 1987, he was featured in the hit film Dirty Dancing as Dr. Jake Houseman, the father of Jennifer Grey's character "Baby". He made further TV appearances on popular shows such as The Golden Girls, for which he received his first Emmy nomination, and Who's the Boss?.

In 1991, Orbach starred in Steven Seagal's action film Out for Justice as police captain Ronnie Donziger, and was featured along with Renée Taylor and John Candy in the comedy film Delirious. That same year, he starred in Disney's Oscar-winning animated musical Beauty and the Beast as the voice, both singing and speaking, of the French-accented candelabrum Lumière, which he played "halfway between Maurice Chevalier and Pepé Le Pew". At the 64th Academy Awards, Orbach performed a live-action stage rendition of the Oscar-nominated song, "Be Our Guest", that he sang in Beauty and the Beast. He later reprised his voice role of Lumière for the film's direct-to-video sequels, multiple episodes of House of Mouse, and the previously-deleted song ("Human Again") that was added to the Beauty and the Beast 2002 IMAX re-release.

=== 1992–2004: Law & Order and stardom ===
From 1992 to 2004, Orbach gained worldwide fame for starring as the world-weary, wisecracking NYPD Detective Lennie Briscoe on the NBC legal drama Law & Order. He joined the main cast of Law & Order during its third season. He had previously guest-starred as a defense attorney on the series and was cast as the new "senior detective" following Paul Sorvino's departure. Orbach's portrayal of Briscoe was based on his similar role from Prince of the City years before, which Law & Order creator Dick Wolf had personally suggested to him at the time of his casting.

Orbach starred on Law & Order for 11 1/2 seasons, ultimately becoming the third longest-serving main cast member, behind S. Epatha Merkerson and Sam Waterston, in the show's initial 20-year run, as well as one of its most popular. During Orbach's tenure on Law & Order, the series won the 1997 Primetime Emmy Award for Outstanding Drama Series among other accolades, made multiple crossover episodes with fellow NBC series Homicide: Life on the Street, and spawned a franchise that included the TV film Exiled: A Law & Order Movie, the spin-off series Law & Order: Special Victims Unit and Law & Order: Criminal Intent, both of which featured Orbach in guest appearances, and three video games.

Orbach was nominated for a 2000 Primetime Emmy Award for Outstanding Lead Actor in a Drama Series, losing to James Gandolfini for The Sopranos. TV Guide named Lennie Briscoe one of their top 25 greatest television detectives of all time.

During his time on Law & Order, Orbach appeared in Jean-Claude Van Damme's 1992 action film Universal Soldier, provided the voice of the main antagonist Sa'luk in the 1996 direct-to-video film Aladdin and the King of Thieves, and co-starred with Al Pacino in the independent film Chinese Coffee, which was filmed in summer 1997 and released in 2000.

== Personal life ==
=== Marriages and family ===
In 1958, Orbach married Marta Curro, with whom he had two sons, Anthony Nicholas and Christopher Benjamin. They divorced in 1975. Elder son Tony is a construction manager and an accomplished crossword puzzle constructor who has published more than 25 puzzles in The New York Times. Younger son Chris Orbach is an actor and a singer. He played Lennie Briscoe's nephew Ken Briscoe during the first season of Special Victims Unit.

In 1979, Jerry Orbach married Broadway dancer Elaine Cancilla, whom he met while starring in Chicago. The couple lived in a high-rise on 53rd Street off Eighth Avenue in Hell's Kitchen, an intersection shared with the Theater District, where Orbach was a fixture in that neighborhood's restaurants and shops. His glossy publicity photo hangs in Ms. Buffy's French Cleaners, and he was a regular at some of the Italian restaurants nearby. After his death, she worked to have the intersection of 53rd and 8th renamed in honor of Orbach; the plans met with some resistance by local planning boards, but were overcome thanks to his popularity and his love of the Big Apple.

=== Illness and death ===
In January 1994, less than two years into his stint on Law & Order, Orbach was diagnosed with prostate cancer. He was treated with radiation therapy, but by December 1994, the cancer had returned and metastasized. At that point, he went on hormone therapy, on which he remained over the next decade while he continued to star on Law & Order. In March 2004, as filming of Law & Order's 2003–04 season neared completion, doctors found that the cancer had spread throughout his organs and switched Orbach to chemotherapy. When Orbach told Dick Wolf that he would reluctantly have to leave the series, Wolf signed him to continue in the role of Lennie Briscoe on the new spin-off Law & Order: Trial by Jury, which gave him a lighter schedule than the original series. In late September and early October, Orbach was able to film scenes for the first two episodes, but his strength was fading; his voice was barely audible while finishing a scene for the second episode, which the crew handled by having his character whispering with colleagues at the back of an active courtroom, so as not to "disrupt" the court.

He ultimately succumbed to the cancer on December 28, 2004, at the Memorial Sloan Kettering Cancer Center in New York at age 69. Orbach's decade-long illness was not revealed to the general public until just weeks before he died.

The day after Orbach's death, the League of American Theatres and Producers dimmed the marquees on Broadway in mourning, one of the highest honors of the American theatre world, while NBC re-aired the Law & Order episode "C.O.D.", the last episode of the original series to feature Orbach, in honor of him. Four days after his death, the first new episode of Criminal Intent, "View from Up Here", was dedicated to Orbach; three days later, the first new episode of Law & Order, "Mammon", featured a pictorial memorial of him. Trial by Jury started its run on March 3, 2004, with Orbach appearing in the first two episodes; on March 25, the episode "Baby Boom" included a scene where the main characters have just returned from his character's funeral, and the episode ended with a screen dedicating the episode to Orbach.

Having had perfect 20/20 vision his whole life, Orbach requested that his eyes be donated after his death. His wish was granted when two people – one who needed correction for a nearsighted eye and another who needed correction for a farsighted eye – received Orbach's corneas. His likeness has been used in an ad campaign for Eye Bank for Sight Restoration in Manhattan. Orbach was interred at Trinity Church Cemetery and Mausoleum in upper Manhattan.

== Honors and legacy ==
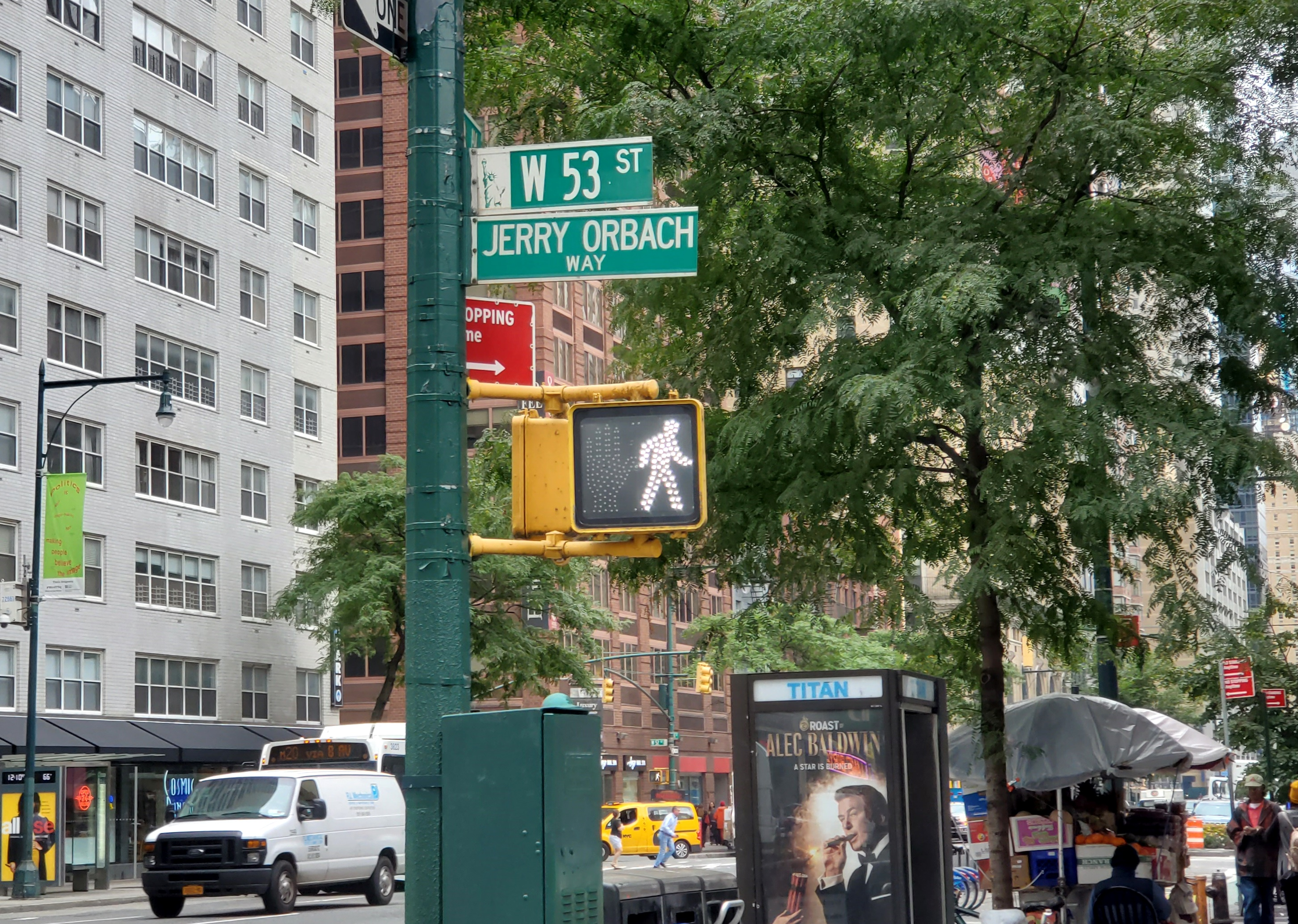
Jerry Orbach Way in New York City, 2019

Orbach was inducted into the American Theater Hall of Fame in 1999. In 2002, Orbach was named a "Living Landmark" by the New York Landmarks Conservancy, along with his Law & Order co-star Sam Waterston. Orbach quipped that the honor meant "that they can't tear me down."

In his obituary, The New York Times described Orbach as "one of the last bona fide leading men of the Broadway musical".

In February 2005, he was posthumously awarded a Screen Actors Guild Award for Outstanding Performance by a Male Actor in a Drama Series for his longtime role on Law & Order. His wife Elaine accepted the award on his behalf.

In 2007, the Jerry Orbach Theatre was named for him in the Snapple Theater Center at 50th Street and Broadway in New York City. At the time, the theater was mounting a revival of The Fantasticks. In September 2007, a portion of New York City's 53rd Street near Eighth Avenue was renamed "Jerry Orbach Way" in his honor. After Law & Order was cancelled in 2010, executive producer René Balcer told The Wall Street Journal, "I always think about the show as before Jerry and after Jerry...You saw the weariness of 25 years of crime-fighting in New York written on his face."

Author Kurt Vonnegut, a fan of Orbach, said during an Australian radio interview in 2005, "People have asked me, you know, 'Who would you rather be, than yourself?'" and he replied, "Jerry Orbach, without a question...I talked to him one time, and he's adorable." New York Times writers Ben Brantley and Richard Severo analyzed the breadth and scope of Orbach's career, and Dirty Dancing co-star Patrick Swayze memorialized Orbach after his death.

== Discography ==
Sources:

- Carnival! Original Broadway Cast (MGM Records, 1961).
- Jerry Orbach: Off Broadway (MGM Records, 1963).
- Annie Get Your Gun - Original Cast Album (RCA Victor, 1966)
- Promises, Promises - Original Cast Album (United Artists Records, 1967)
- Alan Jay Lerner Revisited (Crewe, 1974)
- Chicago - Original Cast Album (Airsta, 1975)
- The Fantasticks - Original Cast Album (MGM Records, 1979)
- Power Of Attorney – He Is My Lawyer (Rock Dream Records, 1984)

== Bibliography ==
- Remember How I Love You: Love Letters from an Extraordinary Marriage (Touchstone, 2009).
- Jerry Orbach, Prince of the City: His Way from the Fantasticks to Law & Order by John Anthony Gilvey, was published on May 1, 2011.
